= Bassler =

Bassler is a surname, and may refer to:

- Bonnie Bassler (born 1962), an American molecular biologist
- Friedrich Bassler (1909–1992), a German hydraulic engineer
- Johnny Bassler (1895–1979), an American baseball catcher
- Ray S. Bassler (1878–1961), an American paleontologist
- Robert Bassler (1903–1975), an American movie producer
- William G. Bassler (born 1938), an American federal judge

Bässler may refer to:

- Hans Bässler (born 1934), a Swiss fencer
- Manfred Bässler (Bässler, born 1935), a botanist
