= Qattara Depression Project =

Hydroelectric macro-engineering concept in Egypt

Coordinates: 29.5000°N 27.5000°E

Map of the Qattara Depression with waterway routes. All proposed routes for a tunnel or canal route from the Mediterranean Sea towards the Qattara Depression

The Qattara Depression Project or Qattara Project is a cancelled macro-engineering project concept in Egypt. Rivalling the Aswan High Dam in scope, the intention is to develop the hydroelectric potential of the Qattara Depression by creating an artificial lake.

The Qattara depression is a region that lies 60 metres (200 ft) below sea level on average and is currently a vast, uninhabited desert. Water could be let into the area by connecting it to the Mediterranean Sea with tunnels or canals. The inflowing water would then evaporate quickly because of the desert climate. A controlled balance of inflow and evaporation would produce a continuous flow to generate hydroelectricity. Eventually, the depression would become a hypersaline lake or a salt pan as the evaporating seawater leaves the salt it contains behind. This would return the Qattara Depression to its current state but with its sabkha soils tens of meters higher, allowing for salt mining.

The concept calls for excavating a large canal or tunnel of about 55 to 100 kilometres (30 to 60 mi), depending on the route chosen to the Mediterranean Sea, to bring seawater into the area. An alternative would be a 320-kilometre (200 mi) pipeline north-east to the freshwater Nile River south of Rosetta. In comparison, Egypt's Suez Canal is 193 kilometres (120 mi) in length. By balancing the inflow and evaporation, the lake's water level can be held constant. Several proposed lake levels are 70, 60 and 50 metres (230, 200 and 160 ft) below sea level. In May 2026, Egypt officially abandoned the Qattara Depression seawater hydroelectric project after determining that it was economically unviable and carried significant environmental and technical risks. Concerns included groundwater salinization, damage to desert ecosystems, and interference with oil and gas operations in the Western Desert. The government has instead adopted a "dry" development strategy that does not involve flooding the depression.

== Proposals ==
=== Roudaire ===
The first documented suggestion for flooding large parts of the Sahara desert was by French geographer François Élie Roudaire whose proposal inspired the writer Jules Verne's final book Invasion of the Sea. Plans to use the Qattara Depression for the generation of electricity reportedly date back to 1912 from Berlin geographer Albrecht Penck.

=== John Ball ===
The subject was discussed in more detail in 1927 by John Ball, English director of the Survey of Egypt. He oversaw the mapping of the area in 1927; and also suggested using it to generate hydroelectricity. Ball also made the first preliminary calculations on the achievable filling rate, inflow rate, electricity production and salinity.

=== 1957 proposal ===
In 1957 the American Central Intelligence Agency proposed to President Dwight Eisenhower that peace in the Middle East could be achieved by flooding the Qattara Depression. The resulting lagoon, according to the CIA, would have four benefits:

- It would be spectacular and peaceful.
- It would materially alter the climate in adjacent areas.
- It would provide work during construction and living areas after completion.
- It would get Egyptian President Gamel Abdel Nasser's "mind on other matters" because "he need[ed] some way to get off the Soviet hook."

=== Friedrich Bassler ===
From 1964 onward, Prof. Friedrich Bassler led the international "Board of Advisers" who were responsible for planning and financing activities for the project. He also advised the Egyptian government on the matter from 1975 onward. He was appointed by the German Federal Ministry of Economics in Bonn to make a preliminary feasibility study.

Bassler was the driving force behind the Qattara Project for nearly a decade. Halfway through the 1970s a team of eight, mostly German, scientists and technicians was working on the planning of the first hydro-solar depression power station in the world. The first "Bassler study" of 1973 laid the basis for the Egyptian government to commission a study of its own. It decided in 1975 that Bassler and a group of companies known as "Joint Venture Qattara" should conduct a feasibility study of the project.

The project concept was: Mediterranean water should be channeled through a canal or tunnel towards the Qattara Depression, which lies below sea level. This water would then fall into the depression through penstocks for electricity generation. The water would evaporate quickly because of the very dry and hot weather once in the depression. This would allow more water to enter the depression and would create a continuous source of electricity.

A canal 60 meters deep would connect the Mediterranean with the depression's edge at this narrow isthmus. This canal would deliver water to the depression as well as being a shipping route towards the Qattara lake, with a harbor and fishing grounds in the depression. The depression was to be filled to a height of 60 m below sea level. It would take a total of 10 years to fill to that level. After that the incoming flow would balance out against the outgoing evaporation, and the lake level would stabilize.

In the first phase of the project the Qattara 1 station was to generate 670 megawatts (MW). The second phase was to generate an additional 1,200 MW. A pumped-storage hydroelectricity facility would increase the peak production capacity by another 4,000 MW, thus totaling about 5,800 MW.

The main problem with the project was the cost and technical difficulty of diverting seawater to the depression. Calculations showed that digging a canal or tunnel would be too expensive. Demining would be needed to remove some of the millions of unexploded ordnance left from World War II in Northern Egypt. Consequently, use of nuclear explosives to excavate the canal was another proposal by Bassler. This plan called for the detonation in boreholes of 213 nuclear devices, each yielding 1.5 megatons (i.e. 100 times that of the atomic bomb used against Hiroshima). This fit within the Atoms for Peace program proposed by President Dwight Eisenhower in 1953. Evacuation plans cited numbers of at least 25,000 evacuees. The shock waves from the explosion might also affect the tectonically unstable Red Sea Rift located just 450 kilometres (280 mi) away from the blast site. Another danger was increased coastal erosion, because sea currents could change in such a way that even very remote coastal areas would erode. Because of the concerns about using a nuclear solution, the Egyptian government turned down the plan, and the project's stakeholders gave up on the project.

=== Continued interest ===
Since then, scientists and engineers still occasionally explore the viability of such a project, as a key to resolving economic, population, and ecological stresses in the area, but the project has yet to be undertaken.

On April 11, 2023, Egypt announced a contract with EGIT Consulting to study the feasibility of the project.

As of 2024, Saudi Arabia and UAE are exploring projects to mine lithium for electric vehicles from existing onshore salt pans as well as salt pans supplemented with Persian Gulf sea water. Although the added value of additional table salt on global markets is low, the clean energy boom presents a unique lithium opportunity if a scheme such as Qattara Depression Project were to materialize. As of December 2024, no such project yet is being seriously considered.

== Cancellation ==
In May 2026, the Egyptian government formally abandoned proposals to develop the Qattara Depression through the introduction of Mediterranean seawater for hydroelectric power generation. A ministerial committee established in 2016 to evaluate development options concluded that the project was economically unfeasible and posed significant environmental and technical challenges. The government subsequently adopted a development strategy that does not involve flooding the depression. Several seawater-flooding proposals were examined and ultimately rejected. Among the principal concerns were the potential contamination of groundwater resources through seawater seepage, increased soil salinity in surrounding areas, and possible impacts on the freshwater systems of the Siwa Oasis. Environmental assessments also highlighted the likely destruction of existing desert ecosystems and the disruption of habitats used by migratory birds and other wildlife.

The committee further noted that much of the Qattara Depression lies within an active oil and gas producing region of Egypt's Western Desert. The creation of a large artificial lake would interfere with existing extraction operations and require substantial modifications to energy infrastructure.

Economic considerations also played a decisive role. The construction of canals or tunnels linking the depression to the Mediterranean Sea was estimated to involve very high costs, while projected benefits compared unfavorably with those of contemporary renewable energy technologies such as solar and wind power.

On the basis of these findings, the seawater hydroelectric scheme was deemed impractical, ending decades of discussion surrounding the project.

== See also ==
- Arpa–Sevan tunnel
- Sahara Sea
- Salton Sea
