= John Ball (geologist) =

British geologist, engineer and geographer

John Ball was an English geologist born in Derby in 1872. He completed his technical education at Freiberg University of Mining and Technology and got a Doctor's degree from the University of Zurich. Ball traveled to the Saharan Desert in 1897. During his life, he explored and surveyed the deserts of Egypt and Sudan, up until his death in 1941 in Port Said.

Ball surveyed the Qattara Depression in Egypt, which lies below sea level, and made the first study of the possibility that this depression could be used for hydroelectric power generation. This concept, the Quattara Depression Project, is unusual in that salt water would be flowing from the Mediterranean Sea into the Qattara Depression, forming an artificial lake below sea level.
