= MAT/6 mine =

Italian anti-tank mine

The MAT/6 is an Italian circular synthetic resin-cased minimum metal blast resistant anti-tank blast mine. It uses a pneumatic fuze which is resistant to shock and blast, and is also claimed to be resistant to mine flails and mine rollers. The mine's plastic case is waterproof, and it can be laid in shallow water. Anti-handling devices may be fitted to the mine.

The mine is no longer in production.

== Specifications ==
- Diameter: 270 mm
- Height: 142 mm
- Weight: 7.1 kg
- Explosive content: 6.3 kg
- Operating force: 180 to 310 kg
- Can be placed Underwater
