= Keiler (mine flail) =

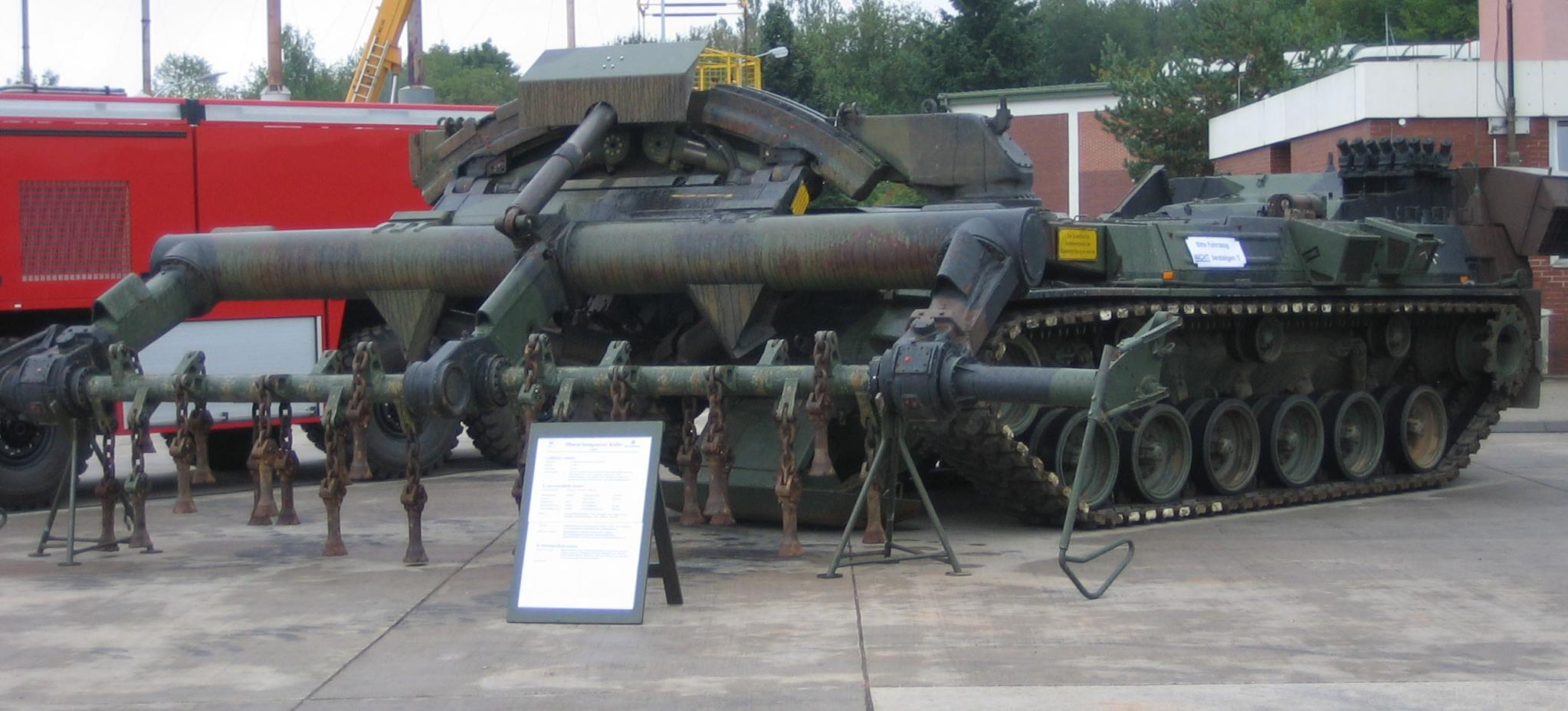
- A Keiler, displayed with its mine flail deployed (2005)
- Type: Mine flail
- Place of origin: Germany

Production history
- Produced: 1997-1998

Specifications
- Mass: 53 tonnes (52 long tons)
- Length: 10.7 m (35 ft 1 in)
- Width: 6.35 m (20 ft 10 in)
- Height: 3.76 m (12 ft 4 in)
- Crew: 2
- Engine: MTU MB 871 Ka 501; 986 hp
- Suspension: torsion-bar
- Operational range: 600 km (370 mi)
- Maximum speed: 50 km/h (31 mph)

Keiler mine flail (German: Minenräumpanzer Keiler, 'tusker') is a mine-clearing vehicle developed by Rheinmetall in Germany to meet the requirements of the German Army. It is a conversion of the M48 Patton medium tank chassis in combination with a German MTU MB 871 Ka 501 liquid-cooled turbocharged Diesel engine. The main role of the Keiler vehicle is to clear a lane through minefields to ensure the safe passage of soldiers and vehicles. A deployable mine flail system has been fixed to the front of the vehicle, which is used to clear both anti-tank and anti-personnel mines. Between 1997 and 1998, 24 vehicles of this kind were produced for the German Army.

== Design ==
=== ABV Keiler ===
Keiler is built on the M48 Patton medium tank hull. Developers removed the turret of the Patton and fitted the vehicle with a heavy-duty rotor-powered mine flail, a rapidly rotating cylinder mounted between two arms in front of the vehicle consisting of two shafts with 24 chains terminating in large metal "feet". In traveling mode, the mine flail folds over the vehicle.

In common with other mine flails, the spinning cylinder swings the chains around, bringing the feet into contact with the ground, thus simulating the force exerted by a person or vehicle passing over the ground. If a flail strikes the ground above a buried mine, the impact will cause the mine to safely detonate. The vehicle can clear a lane 4.7 metres (15 ft) wide and 120 metres (390 ft) long in 10 minutes. An automatic system fixed on the rear of the hull marks the cleared lane.

The Keiler has no defensive weapons except its smoke grenade dischargers. The vehicle is operated by a crew of two (commander and driver).

=== ABV Keiler NG ===
Keiler NG
- Type: Mine flail
- Place of origin: Germany

Production history
- Designed: 2024
- Manufacturer: Rheinmetall

Specifications
- Mass: 63 tonnes (62 long tons)
- Crew: 2
- Secondary armament: Rheinmetall Natter 12.7 RCWS
- Suspension: torsion-bar
- Maximum speed: 65 km/h (40 mph)

At the show Eurosatory 2024, Rheinmetall revealed a new generation of the Keiler, following feedbacks from the operations in Ukraine. The vehicle is based on the chassis of the Kodiak combat engineering vehicle, modified from the Leopard 2.

Changes and equipment

- Additional armour (front and sides)
- Rheinmetall Denel Munitions Plofadder Mine Line Charges, that can clear a minefield of 9×160 meters.
- ROSY smoke grenade launchers
- Magnetic Signature Duplicator

== Propulsion ==
The original engine of the M48 Patton has been replaced with a more powerful, German MTU MB 871 Ka 501 liquid-cooled turbocharged diesel engine. This develops 986 horsepower (735 kW) in traveling mode, and 1,092 horsepower (814 kW) when driving the mine flail. A Renk HSWL 284 M transmission was fitted. The Keiler uses the same Torsion bar suspension as the M48 Patton tank, and has 6 wheels on each side.

== Operators ==
- Germany - As of 2021, 24 Keiler were in service.
