= Devil's gardens =

World War II era minefield in Egypt

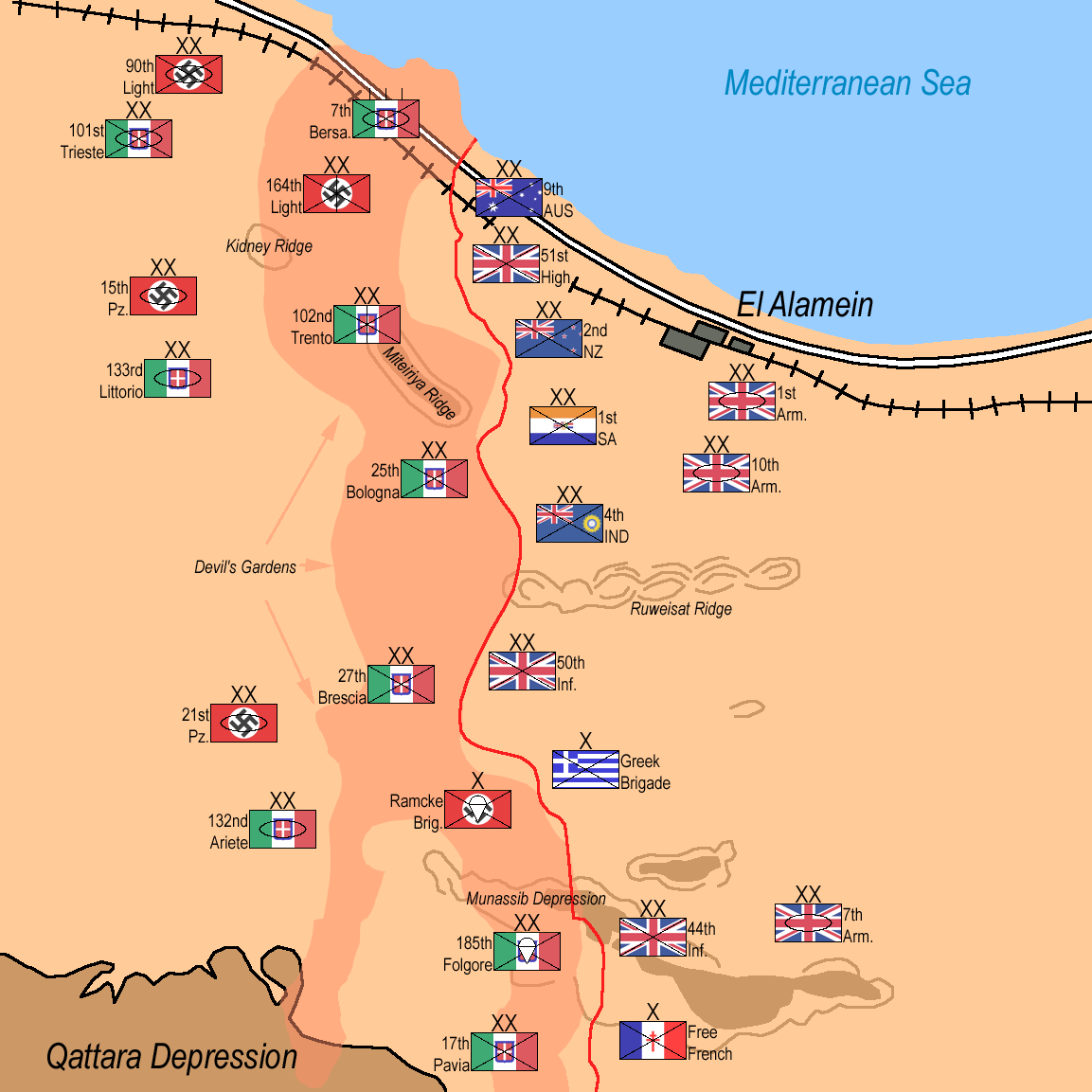
An approximate location of the Devil's gardens.

The Devil's gardens was the name given by Field Marshal (Generalfeldmarschall) Erwin Rommel, commander of the German Afrika Korps during the Second World War, to the defensive entanglements of land mines and barbed wire built to protect Axis defensive positions at El Alamein before the Second Battle of El Alamein in late 1942. The defences stretch from the Mediterranean coast to the Qattara Depression. An estimated 16 million mines, planted by the Europeans during the world wars and called "devil's gardens", still hinder development of most of Matrouh Governorate, and are constantly being removed.

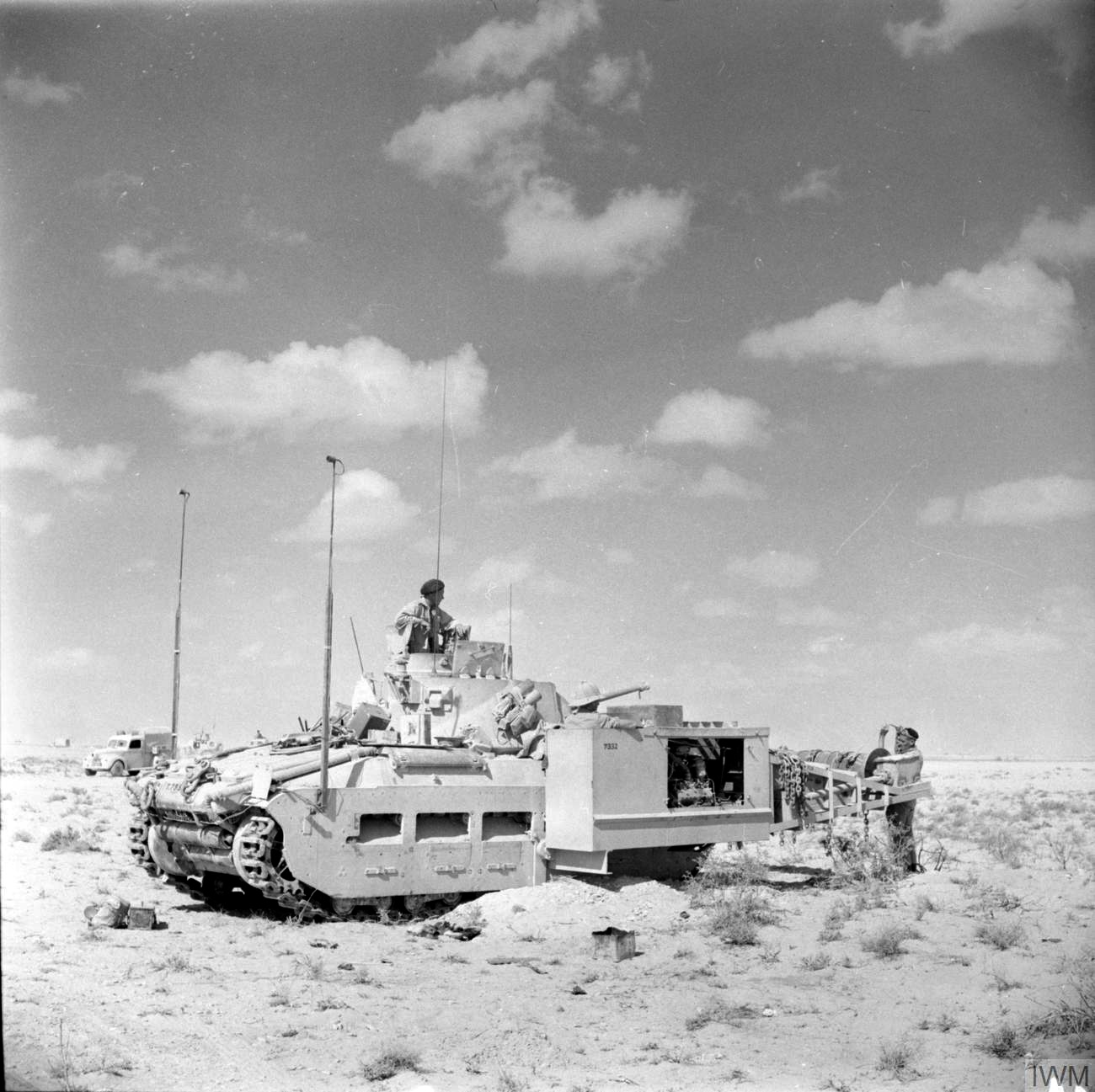
A Matilda scorpion tank equipped for mine clearing.

During the 'break-in' phase of the British attack, the commander of the Eighth Army, Lieutenant General Bernard Montgomery, planned for engineers supporting the infantry brigades of the 2nd New Zealand Division to clear lanes through the minefields, along which attacking formations would pass into the Axis positions. Engineers using hand tools were supplemented by Scorpion tanks equipped with rotating flails to explode anti-tank mines. The Scorpions did not work well and manual clearing had to be employed, which would have been more difficult, had the minefields been sown with more anti-personnel mines.

An estimated 3 million mines were laid before the battle, most of which remain and are becoming more unstable and dangerous.
