= Qara Oasis =

Qara Oasis واحة القارة Qarat ʾUmm el-Sagheir • قارة أم الصغير
- Village
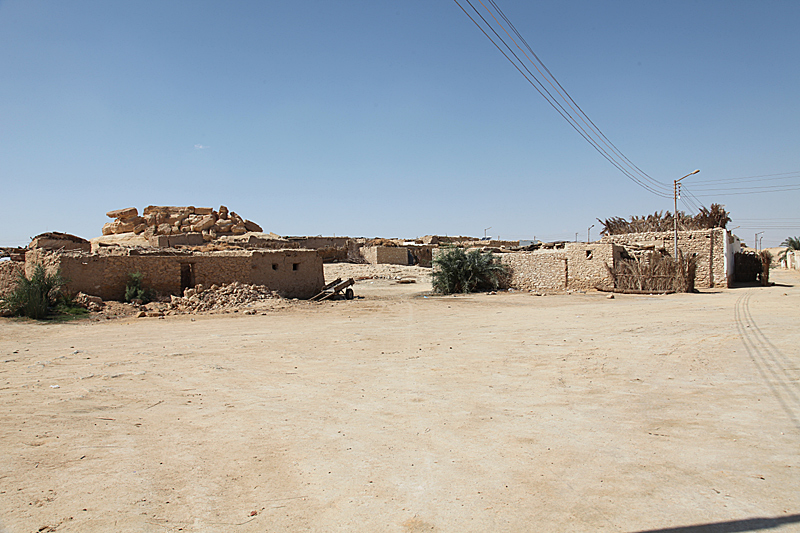
- The village

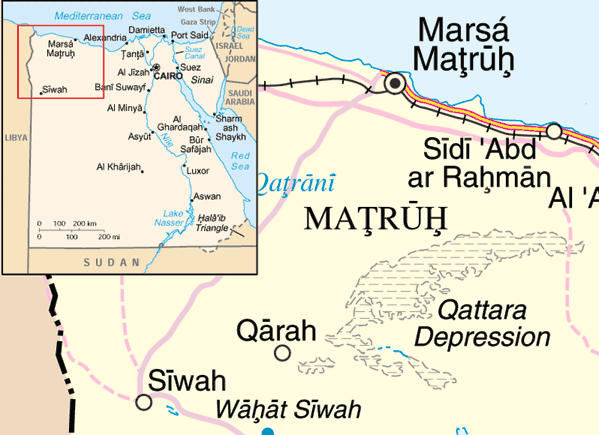
- Location within the Qattara Depression

- Location in Egypt
- Coordinates: 29°37′17.68″N 26°29′50.94″E
- Country: Egypt
- Governorate: Matrouh

Population
  - Total: 363
- Time zone: UTC+2 (EET)
  - Summer (DST): UTC+3 (EEST)

The Qara Oasis (also spelt Cara or Gara; Arabic: واحة القارة; also Qarat Umm El Sagheir, i.e. قارة أم الصغير) is an inhabited oasis in Egypt, with a population of 363 (as of the 11 November 2006 census). This oasis is often disregarded when it comes to counting the number of Egyptian oases as it is very small compared to the others. In local folklore, if a newborn arrives, an elder will die shortly after, thus keeping the population constant. It lies at the northwest edge of the Qattara Depression, 75 km (47 mi) northeast of Siwa Oasis, and belongs to Siwa District within Matrouh Governorate. It is connected to an asphalted sub-road of approximately 100 km (62 mi) in length, in an area called “Bir al-Nisf” located on the Matrouh–Siwa road.

== History ==
Originally, the inhabitants of the village lived in a fortress which they built on top of a nearby rocky mountain, and which was a defensive position that would protect them from hostiles. However today they live in simple houses beneath. The main industry is the production of dates and olives.

The village itself is an archaeological site, built with Kershef material, which is made of silt mixed with salt.

== Environment ==
Among the features of the oasis are thick, high salinity springs that have been known since the Roman era, and a hot water spring called "Kefara", whose temperature reaches 70 degrees Celsius, which are transformed into cooling basins for use in agriculture and the people's consumption, and ancient ruins located at the top of the adjacent mountain, and a market where environmental products and handicrafts are displayed. One of the distinctive dishes of the villagers is "Al-Aqrouz", which is the palm tree, which is traditionally served to the most important guests.

== Demography ==
The population was 363 people as of 2006.

== Economy ==
There is no mobile network service coverage for the area.

Because the oasis is not connected to the national electricity grid, solar cells and diesel generators provide the energy needed for street lighting and home use. It has a school for basic education, and it was declared the first illiteracy-free village in Matrouh Governorate in 2009, but it lacks a medical unit and relief convoys frequent it to provide basic medical services. There is only one car available for supply runs.

== In popular culture ==
The oasis appears in the 1958 war film Ice Cold in Alex.

== Sources ==
- LookLex: Qara, Beyond Space and Time
