= Peaceful nuclear explosion =

Use of nuclear explosives for non-military purposes

Peaceful nuclear explosions (PNEs) are nuclear explosions conducted for non-military purposes. Proposed uses include excavation for the building of canals and harbours, electrical generation, the use of nuclear explosions to drive spacecraft, and as a form of wide-area fracking. PNEs were an area of some research from the late 1950s into the 1980s, primarily in the United States and Soviet Union.

In the U.S., a series of tests were carried out under Project Plowshare. Some of the ideas considered included blasting a new Panama Canal, constructing the proposed Nicaragua Canal, the use of underground explosions to create electricity (Project PACER), and a variety of mining, geological, and radionuclide studies. The largest of the excavation tests was carried out in the Sedan nuclear test in 1962, which released large amounts of radioactive gas into the air. By the late 1960s, public opposition to Plowshare was increasing, and a 1970s study of the economics of the concepts suggested they had no practical use. Plowshare saw decreasing interest from the 1960s, and was officially cancelled in 1977.

The Soviet program started a few years after the U.S. efforts and explored many of the same concepts under their Nuclear Explosions for the National Economy program. The program was more extensive, eventually conducting 239 nuclear explosions. Some of these tests also released radioactivity, including a significant release of plutonium into the groundwater and the polluting of an area near the Volga River. A major part of the program in the 1970s and 80s was the use of very small bombs to produce shock waves as a seismic measuring tool, and as part of these experiments, two bombs were successfully used to seal blown-out oil wells. The program officially ended in 1988.

As part of ongoing arms control efforts, both programs came to be controlled by a variety of agreements. Most notable among these is the 1976 Treaty on Underground Nuclear Explosions for Peaceful Purposes (PNE Treaty). The Comprehensive Nuclear-Test-Ban Treaty (CTBT) of 1996 prohibits all nuclear explosions, regardless of whether they are for peaceful purposes, but has not entered into force. Peaceful nuclear explosions have been raised most recently as a method of asteroid impact avoidance.

== History ==
=== Peaceful Nuclear Explosions Treaty ===
In the PNE Treaty, the signatories agreed: not to carry out any individual nuclear explosions having a yield exceeding 150 kilotons TNT equivalent; not to carry out any group explosion (consisting of a number of individual explosions) having an aggregate yield exceeding 1,500 kilotons; and not to carry out any group explosion having an aggregate yield exceeding 150 kilotons unless the individual explosions in the group could be identified and measured by agreed verification procedures. The parties also reaffirmed their obligations to comply fully with the Limited Test Ban Treaty of 1963.

The parties reserve the right to carry out nuclear explosions for peaceful purposes in the territory of another country if requested to do so, but only in full compliance with the yield limitations and other provisions of the PNE Treaty and in accord with the Non-Proliferation Treaty.

Articles IV and V of the PNE Treaty set forth the agreed verification arrangements. In addition to the use of national technical means, the treaty states that information and access to sites of explosions will be provided by each side, and includes a commitment not to interfere with verification means and procedures.

The protocol to the PNE Treaty sets forth the specific agreed arrangements for ensuring that no weapon-related benefits precluded by the Threshold Test Ban Treaty are derived by carrying out a nuclear explosion used for peaceful purposes, including provisions for use of the hydrodynamic yield measurement method, seismic monitoring, and on-site inspection.

The agreed statement that accompanies the treaty specifies that a "peaceful application" of an underground nuclear explosion would not include the developmental testing of any nuclear explosive.

=== United States: Operation Plowshare ===
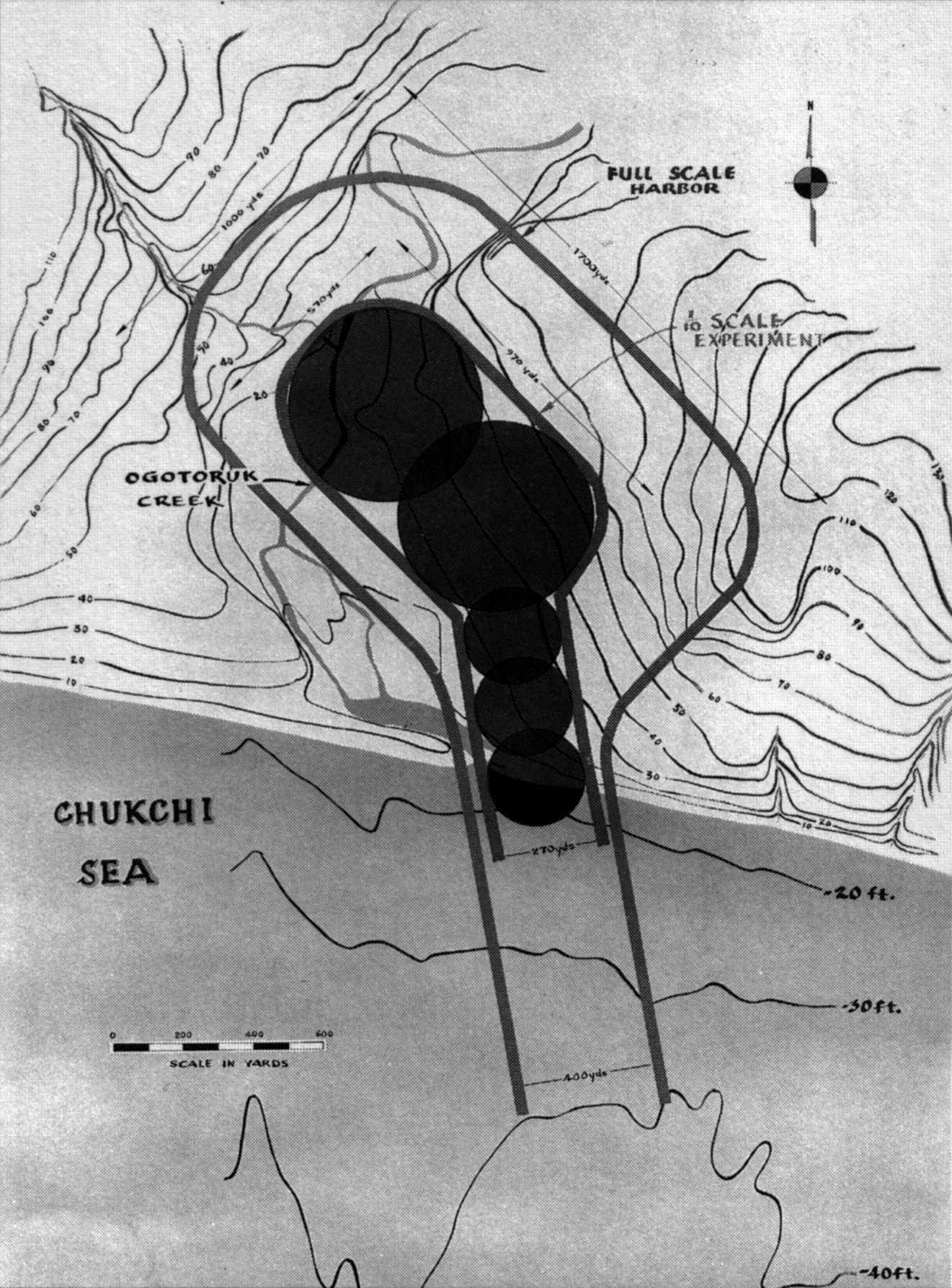
One of the Chariot schemes involved chaining five thermonuclear devices to create the artificial harbor.

Operation Plowshare was the name of the U.S. program for the development of techniques to use nuclear explosives for peaceful purposes. The name was coined in 1961, taken from Micah 4:3 ("And he shall judge among the nations, and shall rebuke many people: and they shall beat their swords into plowshares, and their spears into pruning hooks: nation shall not lift up sword against nation, neither shall they learn war any more"). Twenty-eight nuclear blasts were detonated between 1961 and 1973.

One of the first U.S. proposals for peaceful nuclear explosions that came close to being carried out was Project Chariot, which would have used several hydrogen bombs to create an artificial harbor at Cape Thompson, Alaska. It was never carried out due to concerns for the native populations and the fact that there was little potential use for the harbor to justify its risk and expense. There was also talk of using nuclear explosions to excavate a second Panama Canal, as well as an alternative to the Suez Canal.

The largest excavation experiment took place in 1962 at the Department of Energy's Nevada Test Site. The Sedan nuclear test carried out as part of Operation Storax displaced 12 million tons of earth, creating the largest man-made crater in the world, generating a large nuclear fallout over Nevada and Utah. Three tests were conducted in order to stimulate natural gas production, but the effort was abandoned as impractical because of cost and radioactive contamination of the gas.

There were many negative impacts from Project Plowshare's 27 nuclear explosions. For example, the Project Gasbuggy site, located 89 kilometres (55 mi) east of Farmington, New Mexico, still contains nuclear contamination from a single subsurface blast in 1967. Other consequences included blighted land, relocated communities, tritium-contaminated water, radioactivity, and fallout from debris being hurled high into the atmosphere. These were ignored and downplayed until the program was terminated in 1977, due in large part to public opposition, after $770 million had been spent on the project.

=== Soviet Union: Nuclear Explosions for the National Economy ===
The Soviet Union conducted a much more vigorous program of 239 nuclear tests, some with multiple devices, between 1965 and 1988 under the auspices of Program No. 6—Employment of Nuclear Explosive Technologies in the Interests of National Economy and Program No. 7—Nuclear Explosions for the National Economy.

The initial program was patterned on the U.S. version, with the same basic concepts being studied. One test, Chagan test in January 1965, has been described as a "near clone" of the U.S. Sedan shot. Like Sedan, Chagan also resulted in a massive plume of radioactive material being blown high into the atmosphere, with an estimated 20% of the fission products with it. Detection of the plume over Japan led to accusations by the U.S. that the Soviets had carried out an above-ground test in violation of the Partial Test Ban Treaty, but these charges were later dropped.

The later, and more extensive, "Deep Seismic Sounding" Program focused on the use of much smaller explosions for various geological uses. Some of these tests are considered to be operational, not purely experimental. These included the use of peaceful nuclear explosions to create deep seismic profiles. Compared to the usage of conventional explosives or mechanical methods, nuclear explosions allow the collection of longer seismic profiles (up to several thousand kilometres).

Alexey Yablokov has claimed that all PNE technologies have non-nuclear alternatives and that many PNEs actually caused nuclear disasters.

Reports on the successful Soviet use of nuclear explosions in extinguishing out-of-control gas well fires were widely cited in United States policy discussions of options for stopping the 2010 Gulf of Mexico Deepwater Horizon oil spill.

=== Other nations ===
Germany at one time considered manufacturing nuclear explosives for civil engineering purposes. In the early 1970s a feasibility study was conducted for a project to build a canal from the Mediterranean Sea to the Qattara Depression in the Western Desert of Egypt using nuclear demolition. This project proposed to use 213 devices, with yields of 1 to 1.5 megatons, detonated at depths of 100 to 500 m (330 to 1,640 ft) to build this canal for the purpose of producing hydroelectric power.

The Smiling Buddha, India's first explosive nuclear device, was described by the Indian Government as a peaceful nuclear explosion.

In Australia, nuclear blasting was proposed as a way of mining iron ore in the Pilbara.

== Applications ==
=== Civil engineering and energy production ===
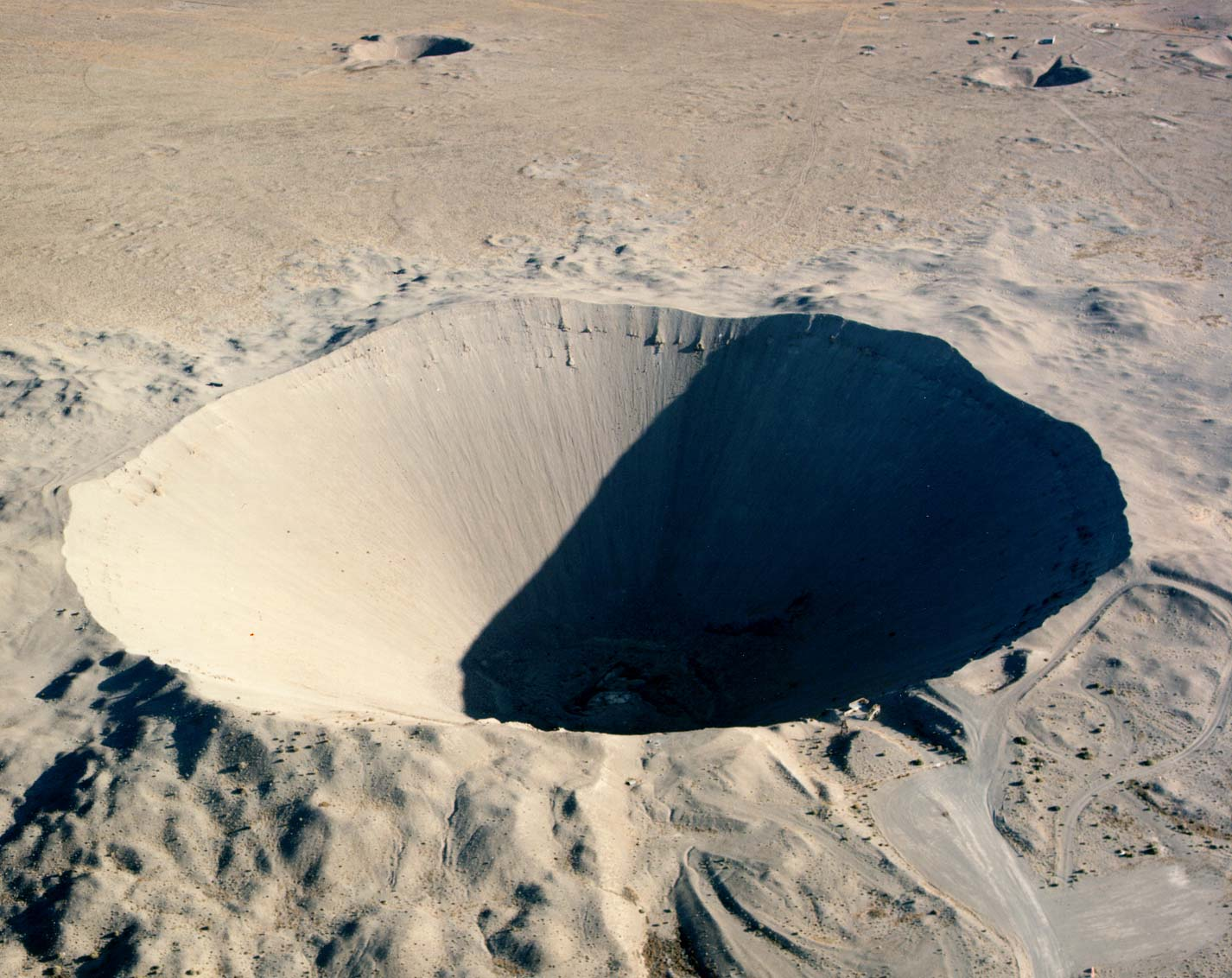
The 1962 Sedan nuclear test formed a crater 100 m (330 ft) deep with a diameter of about 390 m (1,300 ft) as a means of investigating the possibilities of using peaceful nuclear explosions for large-scale earth moving. If this test was conducted in 1965, when improvements in device design were realized, a 100-fold reduction in radiation release was considered feasible. The 140 kt Soviet Chagan (nuclear test), comparable in yield to the Sedan test of 104 kt, formed Lake Chagan, reportedly used as a watering hole for cattle and human swimming.

Apart from their use as weapons, nuclear explosives have been tested and used, in a similar manner to chemical high explosives, for various non-military uses. These have included large-scale earth moving, isotope production and the stimulation and closing-off of the flow of natural gas.

At the peak of the Atomic Age, the United States initiated Operation Plowshare, involving "peaceful nuclear explosions". The United States Atomic Energy Commission chairman announced that the Plowshare project was intended to "highlight the peaceful applications of nuclear explosive devices and thereby create a climate of world opinion that is more favorable to weapons development and tests". The Operation Plowshare program included 27 nuclear tests designed towards investigating these non-weapon uses from 1961 through 1973. Due to the inability of the U.S. physicists to reduce the fission fraction of low-yield (approximately 1 kiloton) nuclear devices that would have been required for many civil engineering projects, when long-term health and clean-up costs from fission products were included in the cost, there was virtually no economic advantage over conventional explosives except for potentially the very largest projects.

Map of all proposed routes for a tunnel and/or canal route from the Mediterranean Sea to the Qattara Depression. No route was shorter than 55 kilometers in length. Canal-cutting investigations began with the buggy salvo shot of Operation Crosstie in 1967.

The Qattara Depression Project was developed by Professor Friedrich Bassler during his appointment to the West German ministry of economics in 1968. He put forth a plan to create a Saharan lake and hydroelectric power station by blasting a tunnel between the Mediterranean Sea and the Qattara Depression in Egypt, an area that lies below sea level. The core problem of the entire project was the water supply to the depression. Calculations by Bassler showed that digging a canal or tunnel would be too expensive, therefore Bassler determined that the use of nuclear explosive devices, to excavate the canal or tunnel, would be the most economical. The Egyptian government declined to pursue the idea.

The Soviet Union conducted a much more exhaustive program than Plowshare, with 239 nuclear tests between 1965 and 1988. Furthermore, many of the "tests" were considered economic applications, not tests, in the Nuclear Explosions for the National Economy program.

These included a 30-kiloton explosion being used to close the Uzbekistani Urtabulak gas well in 1966 that had been blowing since 1963, and a few months later a 47-kiloton explosive was used to seal a higher-pressure blowout at the nearby Pamuk gas field. (For more details, see Blowout (well drilling)#Use of nuclear explosions.)

Devices that produced the highest proportion of their yield via fusion-only reactions are possibly the Taiga Soviet peaceful nuclear explosions of the 1970s. Their public records indicate 98% of their 15 kiloton explosive yield was derived from fusion reactions, so only 0.3 kiloton was derived from fission.

The repeated detonation of nuclear devices underground in salt domes, in a somewhat analogous manner to the explosions that power a car's internal combustion engine (in that it would be a heat engine), has also been proposed as a means of fusion power in what is termed PACER. Other investigated uses for low-yield peaceful nuclear explosions were underground detonations to stimulate, by a process analogous to fracking, the flow of petroleum and natural gas in tight formations; this was developed most in the Soviet Union, with an increase in the production of many well heads being reported.

=== Terraforming ===
In 2015, billionaire entrepreneur Elon Musk popularized an approach in which the cold planet Mars could be terraformed by the detonation of high-fusion-yielding thermonuclear devices over the mostly dry-ice icecaps on the planet. Musk's specific plan would not be very feasible within the energy limitations of historically manufactured nuclear devices (ranging in kilotons of TNT-equivalent), therefore requiring major advancement for it to be considered. In part due to these problems, the physicist Michio Kaku (who initially put forward the concept) instead suggests using nuclear reactors in the typical land-based district heating manner to make isolated tropical biomes on the Martian surface.

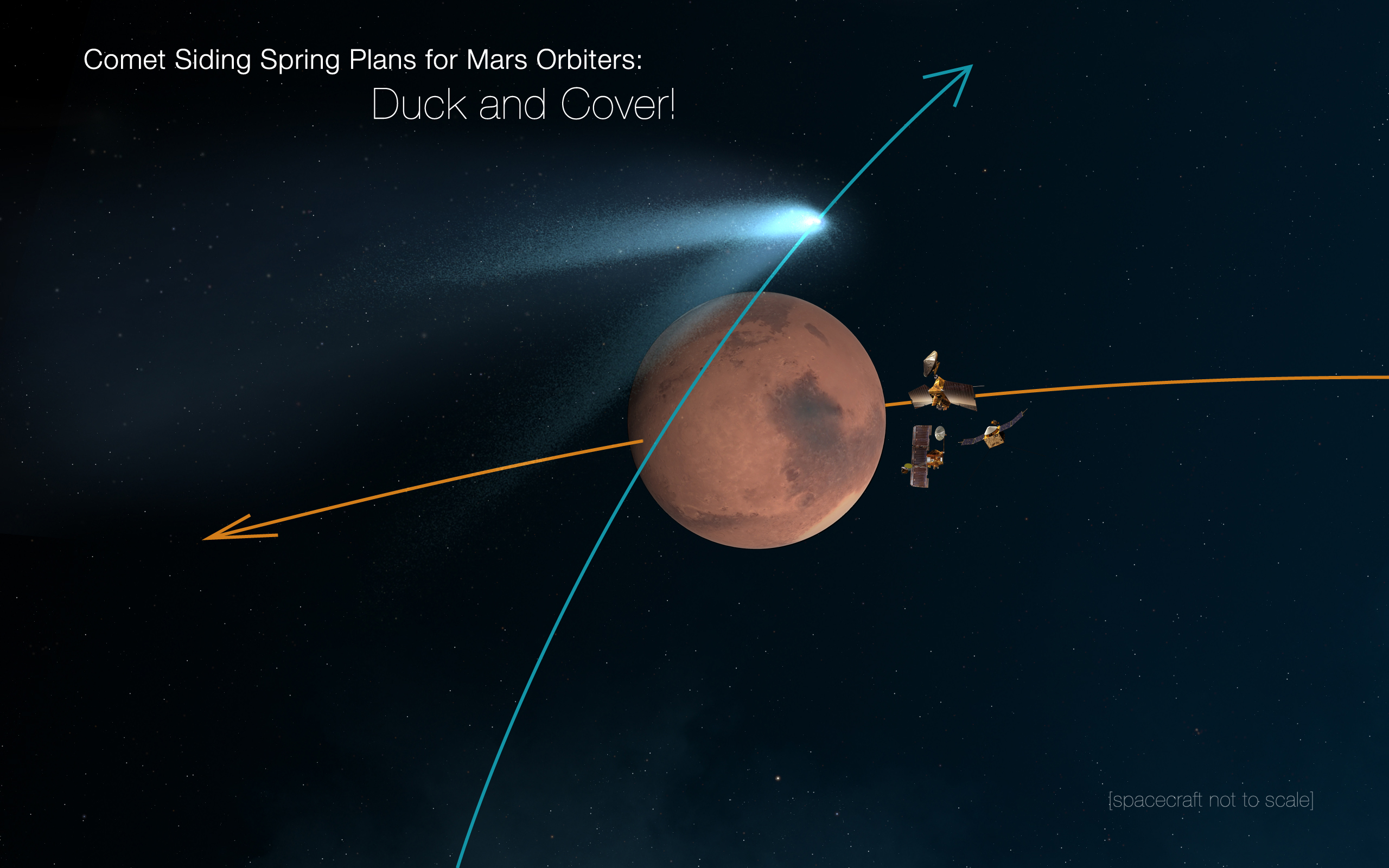
Comet "Siding Spring" made a close approach to the planet Mars in October 2014.

Alternatively, as nuclear detonations are presently somewhat limited in terms of demonstrated achievable yield, the use of an off-the-shelf nuclear explosive device could be employed to "nudge" a Martian-grazing comet toward a pole of the planet. Impact would be a much more efficient scheme to deliver the required energy, water vapor, greenhouse gases, and other biologically significant volatiles that could begin to quickly terraform Mars. One such opportunity for this occurred in October 2014 when a "once-in-a-million-years" comet (designated as C/2013 A1, also known as comet "Siding Spring") came within 140000 km (87000 miles) of the Martian atmosphere.

=== Physics ===
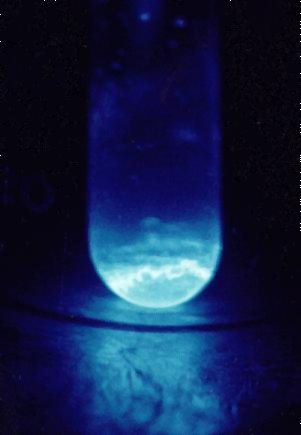
The element einsteinium was first discovered, in minute quantities, following the analysis of the fallout from the first thermonuclear atmospheric test.

The discovery and synthesis of new chemical elements by nuclear transmutation, and their production in the necessary quantities to allow study of their properties, was carried out in nuclear explosive device testing. For example, the discovery of the short-lived einsteinium and fermium, both created under the intense neutron flux environment within thermonuclear explosions, followed the first Teller–Ulam thermonuclear device test—Ivy Mike. The rapid capture of so many neutrons required in the synthesis of einsteinium would provide the needed direct experimental confirmation of the so-called r-process, the multiple neutron absorptions needed to explain the cosmic nucleosynthesis (production) of all chemical elements heavier than nickel on the periodic table in supernova explosions, before beta decay, with the r-process explaining the existence of many stable elements in the universe.

The worldwide presence of new isotopes from atmospheric testing beginning in the 1950s led to the 2008 development of a reliable way to detect art forgeries. Paintings created after that period may contain traces of caesium-137 and strontium-90, isotopes that did not exist in nature before 1945. (Fission products were produced in the natural nuclear fission reactor at Oklo about 1.7 billion years ago, but these decayed away before the earliest known human painting.)

Both climatology and particularly aerosol science, a subfield of atmospheric science, were largely created to answer the question of how far and wide fallout would travel. Similar to radioactive tracers used in hydrology and materials testing, fallout and the neutron activation of nitrogen gas served as a radioactive tracer that was used to measure and then help model global circulations in the atmosphere by following the movements of fallout aerosols.

After the Van Allen Belts surrounding Earth were discovered about in 1958, James Van Allen suggested that a nuclear detonation would be one way of probing the magnetic phenomenon. Data obtained from the August 1958 Project Argus test shots, a high-altitude nuclear explosion investigation, were vital to the early understanding of Earth's magnetosphere.

Soviet nuclear physicist and Nobel Peace Prize recipient Andrei Sakharov also proposed the idea that earthquakes could be mitigated and particle accelerators could be made by utilizing nuclear explosions, with the latter created by connecting a nuclear explosive device with another of his inventions, the explosively pumped flux compression generator, to accelerate protons to collide with each other to probe their inner workings, an endeavor that is now done at much lower energy levels with non-explosive superconducting magnets in CERN. Sakharov suggested to replace the copper coil in his MK generators by a big superconductor solenoid to magnetically compress and focus underground nuclear explosions into a shaped charge effect. He theorized this could focus 10^{23} positively charged protons per second on a 1 mm^{2} surface, then envisaged making two such beams collide in the form of a supercollider.

Underground nuclear explosive data from peaceful nuclear explosion test shots have been used to investigate the composition of Earth's mantle, analogous to the exploration geophysics practice of mineral prospecting with chemical explosives in "deep seismic sounding" reflection seismology.

Project A119, proposed in the 1960s, which as Apollo scientist Gary Latham explained, would have been the detonating of a "smallish" nuclear device on the Moon in order to facilitate research into its geologic make-up. Analogous in concept to the comparatively low yield explosion created by the water prospecting (LCROSS) Lunar Crater Observation and Sensing Satellite mission, which launched in 2009 and released the "Centaur" kinetic energy impactor, an impactor with a mass of 2,305 kg (5,081 lb), and an impact velocity of about 9,000 km/h (5,600 mph), releasing the kinetic energy equivalent of detonating approximately 2 tons of TNT (8.86 GJ).

=== Propulsion use ===
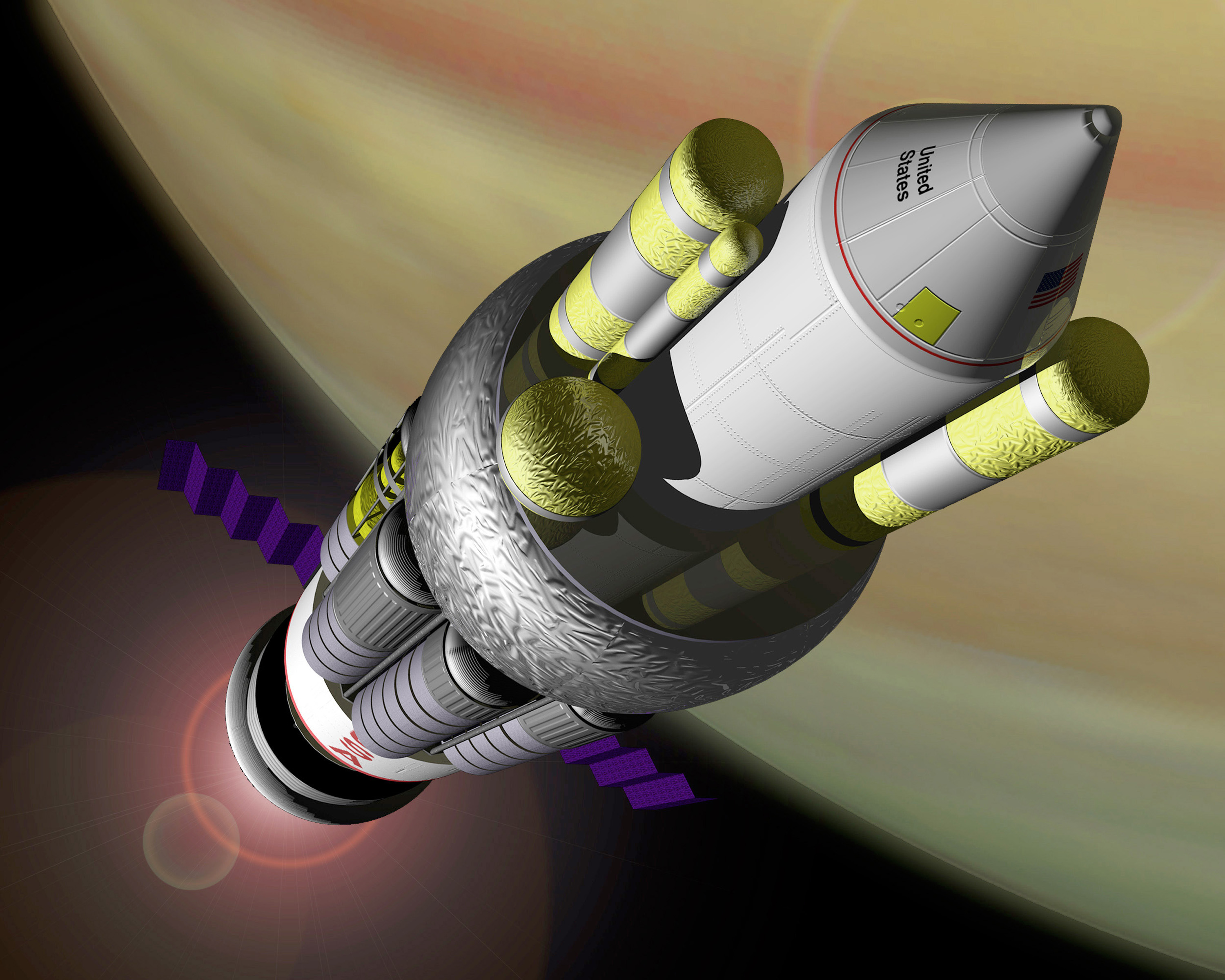
An artist's conception of the NASA reference design for the Project Orion spacecraft powered by nuclear pulse propulsion

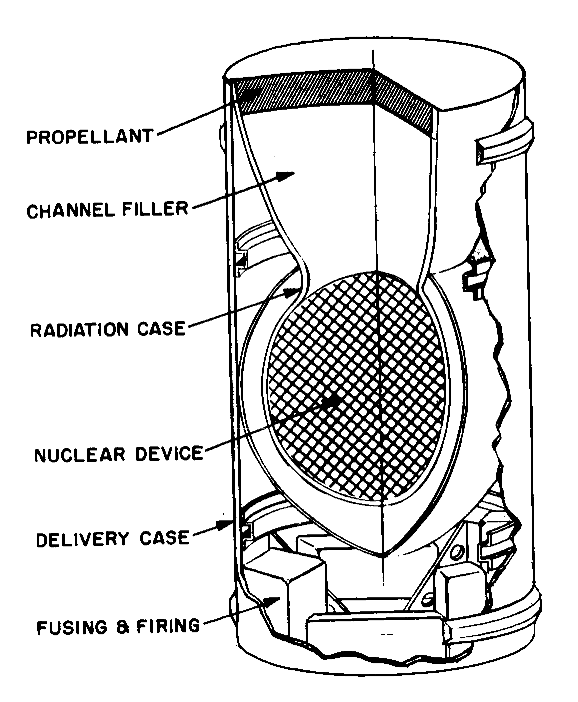
A nuclear shaped charge design that was to provide nuclear pulse propulsion to the Project Orion vehicle

The first preliminary examination of the effects of nuclear detonations upon various metal and non-metal materials, occurred in 1955 with Operation Teapot, were a chain of approximately basketball sized spheres of material, were arrayed at fixed aerial distances, descending from the shot tower. In what was then a surprising experimental observation, all but the spheres directly within the shot tower survived, with the greatest ablation noted on the aluminum sphere located 18 metres (60 ft) from the detonation point, with slightly over 25 millimetres (1 in) of surface material absent upon recovery. These spheres are often referred to as "Lew Allen's balls", after the project manager during the experiments.

The ablation data collected for various materials and the distances the spheres were propelled, serve as the bedrock for the nuclear pulse propulsion study, Project Orion. The direct use of nuclear explosives, by using the impact of ablated propellant plasma from a nuclear shaped charge acting on the rear pusher plate of a ship, was and continues to be seriously studied as a potential propulsion mechanism.

Although likely never achieving orbit due to aerodynamic drag, the first macroscopic object to obtain Earth orbital velocity was a "900 kg (2,000 lb) manhole cover" propelled by the somewhat focused detonation of test shot Pascal-B in August 1957. The use of a subterranean shaft and nuclear device to propel an object to escape velocity has since been termed a "thunder well".

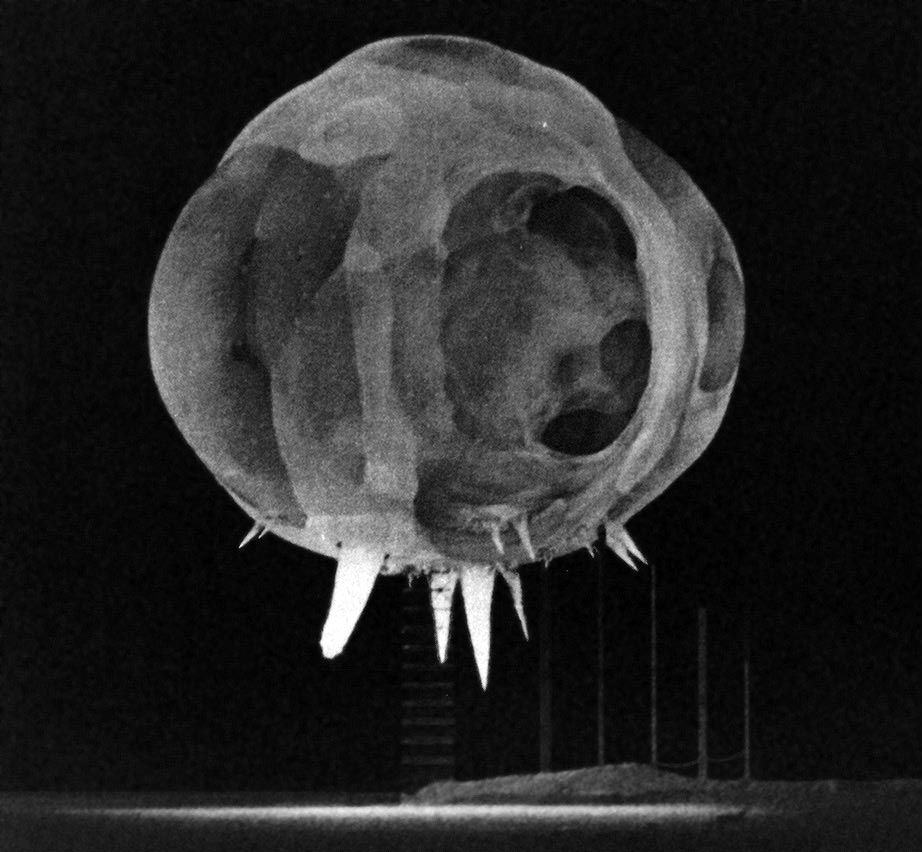
The bright spikes extending below the initial fireball of one of 1952's Operation Tumbler–Snapper test shots are known as the "rope trick effect". They are caused by the intense flash of X-rays released by the explosion heating the tower holding guy-wires white hot. Project Excalibur intended to focus these X-rays to allow attacks over long distances.

In the 1970s Edward Teller, in the United States, popularized the concept of using a nuclear detonation to power an explosively pumped soft X-ray laser as a component of a ballistic missile defense shield known as Project Excalibur. This created dozens of highly focused X-ray beams that would cause the missile to break up due to laser ablation.

Laser ablation is one of the damage mechanisms of a laser weapon, but it is also one of the researched methods behind pulsed laser propulsion intended for spacecraft, though usually powered by means of conventionally pumped, laser arrays. For example, ground flight testing by Leik Myrabo, using a non-nuclear, conventionally powered pulsed laser test-bed, successfully lifted a lightcraft 72 meters in altitude by a method similar to ablative laser propulsion in 2000.

A powerful solar system based soft X-ray, to ultraviolet, laser system has been calculated to be capable of propelling an interstellar spacecraft, by the light sail principle, to 11% of the speed of light. In 1972 it was also calculated that a 1 Terawatt, 1-km diameter X-ray laser with 1 angstrom wavelength impinging on a 1-km diameter sail, could propel a spacecraft to Alpha Centauri in 10 years.

=== Asteroid impact avoidance ===
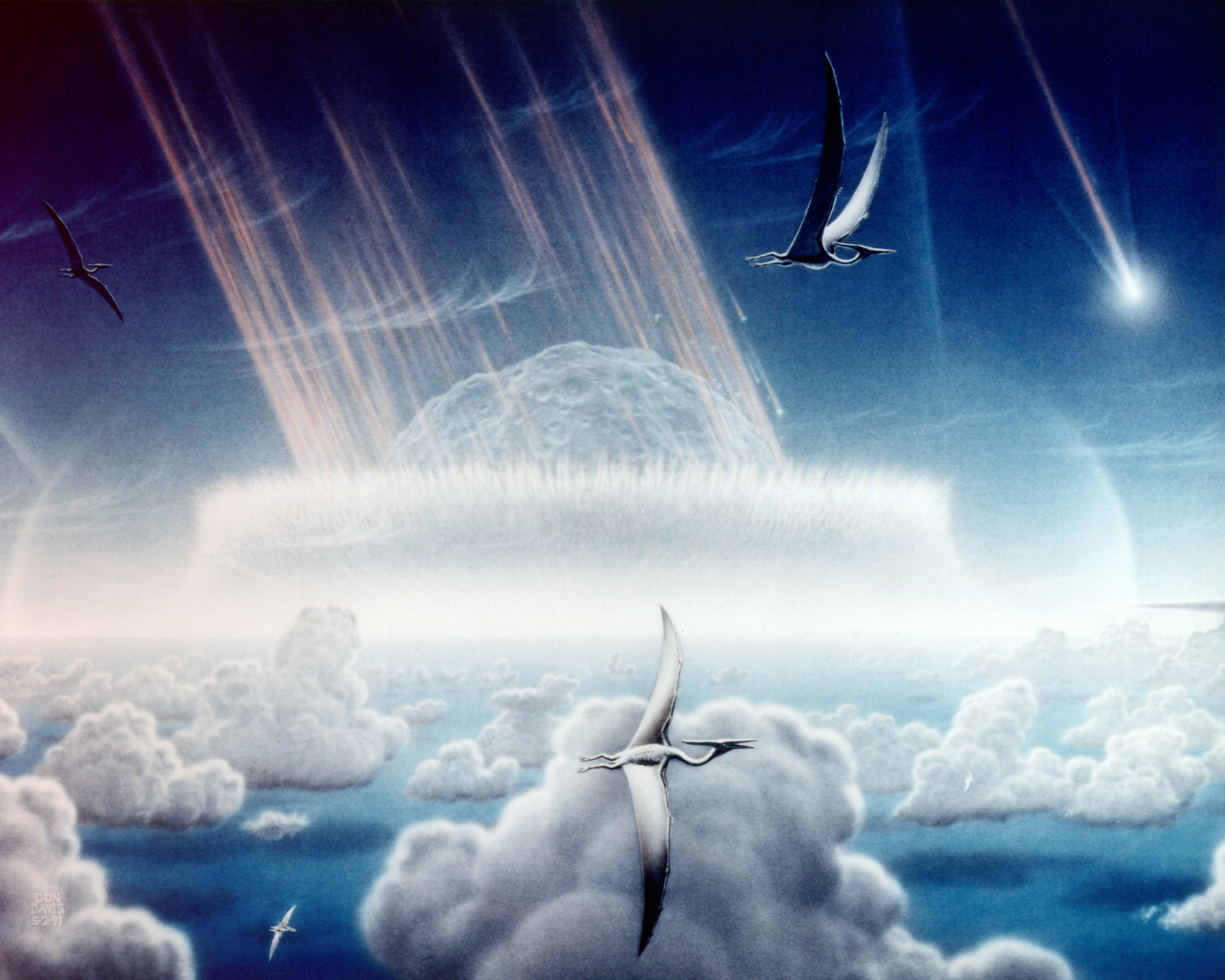
Artist's impression of the impact event that resulted in the Cretaceous–Paleogene extinction event, which resulted in the extinction of the non-avian dinosaurs some 65 million years ago. A natural impact with an explosive yield of 100 teratons of TNT (4.2×10^{23} J). The most powerful man-made explosion, the Tsar Bomba, by comparison had a yield almost 2 million times smaller – 57 megatons of TNT (2.4×10^{17} J). The 1994 Comet Shoemaker–Levy 9 impacts on planet Jupiter, the Tunguska and Chelyabinsk asteroid–Earth collisions of 1908 and 2013 respectively, have served as an impetus for the analysis of technologies that could prevent the destruction of human life by impact events.

A proposed means of averting an asteroid impacting with Earth, assuming short lead times between detection and Earth impact, is to detonate one, or a series, of nuclear explosive devices, on, in, or in a stand-off proximity orientation with the asteroid, with the latter method occurring far enough away from the incoming threat to prevent the potential fracturing of the near-Earth object, but still close enough to generate a high thrust laser ablation effect.

A 2007 NASA analysis of impact avoidance strategies using various technologies stated:

Nuclear stand-off explosions are assessed to be 10–100 times more effective than the non-nuclear alternatives analyzed in this study. Other techniques involving the surface or subsurface use of nuclear explosives may be more efficient, but they run an increased risk of fracturing the target near-Earth object. They also carry higher development and operations risks.

== See also ==
- Nuclear weapon design#Clean bombs
- Pure fusion weapon
