= Mine flail =

Vehicle-mounted anti-mine device

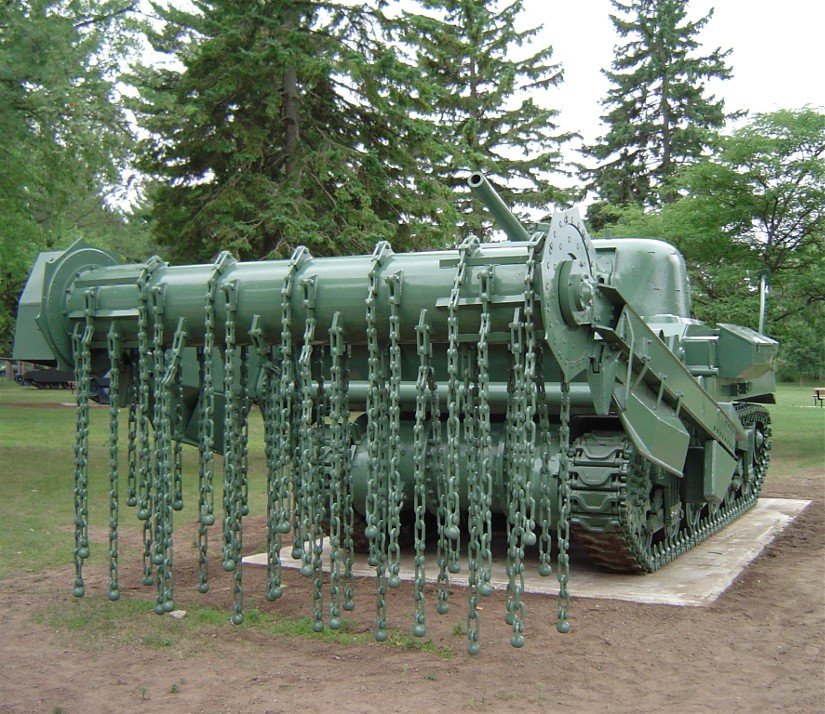
A preserved World War II Sherman Crab, an M4 Sherman tank fitted with a flail

A mine flail is a vehicle-mounted device that makes a safe path through a minefield by deliberately detonating land mines in front of the vehicle that carries it. They can also be used in demining operations. Mine flails were first used by the British during World War II.

The mine flail consists of a number of heavy chains ending in fist-sized steel balls (flails) that are attached to a horizontal, rapidly rotating rotor mounted on two arms in front of the vehicle. The rotor's rotation makes the flails spin wildly and violently pound the ground. The force of a flail strike above a buried mine mimics the weight of a person or vehicle and causes the mine to detonate, but in a safe manner that does little damage to the flails or the vehicle.

== World War II ==
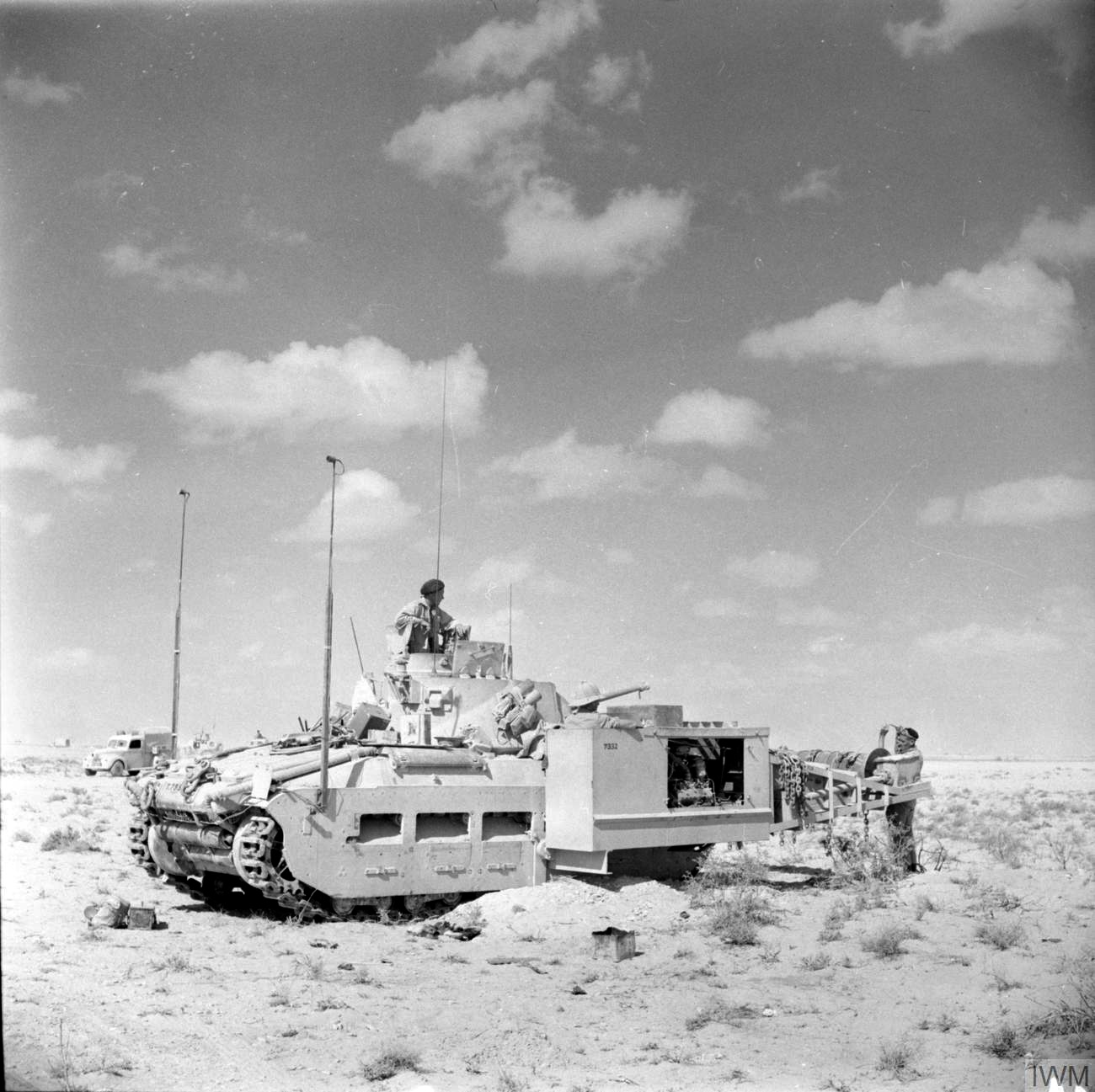
Matilda Scorpion Mk 1. The position of the flail operator is outside the tank.

The idea is commonly attributed to a South African soldier, Captain Abraham du Toit. A test rig was constructed in South Africa and results were so encouraging that du Toit was promoted and sent to England to develop the idea.

Before du Toit left for England, he described his idea to Captain Norman Berry, a mechanical engineer who had been sent to South Africa in 1941 to evaluate the system. Berry later served in the British Eighth Army during the Western Desert campaign. He had become an enthusiast for the mine flail idea; he lobbied senior officers to authorize development of a flail and carried out his own experiments with mine flails in the spring of 1942. Later Major L. A. Girling was given the task of developing a similar device after it had been independently re-invented by another South African officer. When Berry heard of this, he handed over his work to Girling (who had had no idea he was duplicating du Toit's current work in England, as that was still highly secret). David Gustanski made the device that connected to the side of the tank and made the flail raise and lower.

=== Matilda Scorpion ===
Development by Girling's team in Egypt continued over the summer of 1942 and resulted in the "Matilda Scorpion" (the name came from a senior officer's remark on the tank's appearance). This was a Matilda tank fitted with a rotor, mounted on two arms, roughly 6 feet (1.8 m) in front of the tank. The rotor carried 24 flails and was driven at 100 rpm by a 105-horsepower (78 kW) Ford V8 engine. This second engine was fitted in an armoured box mounted on the right side of the tank, the outside box included space for a crewman who operated the device. Although the mine sweeping process was slow, the Scorpions raised such a huge dust cloud when used in the desert that they obscured themselves from German gunners. The cloud also blinded the drivers; the crews had to resort to wearing their gas masks in order to breathe.

Twenty-five Matilda Scorpions, operated by the 1st Army Tank Brigade's 42nd Royal Tank Regiment and 44th Royal Tank Regiment, were available by October 1942 and took part in the Second Battle of El Alamein. German minefields around El Alamein contained around three million mines and had been named the Devil's gardens by the German commander, Erwin Rommel. Breaching these minefields was vital to the Allied battleplan.

During the battle, the Scorpions were less successful than hoped. While reasonably effective at mine clearing, the hastily developed flail system was unreliable and broke down frequently. Also, there were frequent engine failures, as the air filters were overwhelmed by the volume of dust produced by flailing or the engines overheated because of the desert environment. Much of the mine clearing that was critical to the Commonwealth victory still had to be carried out by hand. One unexpected effect was that the noise, dust and terrifying appearance of an approaching flail tank caused several Axis infantry units to surrender without resistance.

After the battle, a Mark II version of the Scorpion was produced by removing the main gun, as that was thought to be unnecessary. Controls for the flail were moved into the turret so the flail operator could be moved inside the tank, taking the place of the gunner. Engine air filters were improved and unreliable components strengthened. Mark III and Mark IV Scorpions were later developed that were based on the M3 Grant. This larger tank was a more suitable mount for a flail than the Matilda and many became available for modification as, by this time, they were being replaced on the battlefield by the M4 Sherman. A small number of these Grant Scorpions were produced and were used during the remainder of the North African campaign and later during the Allied invasion of Sicily.

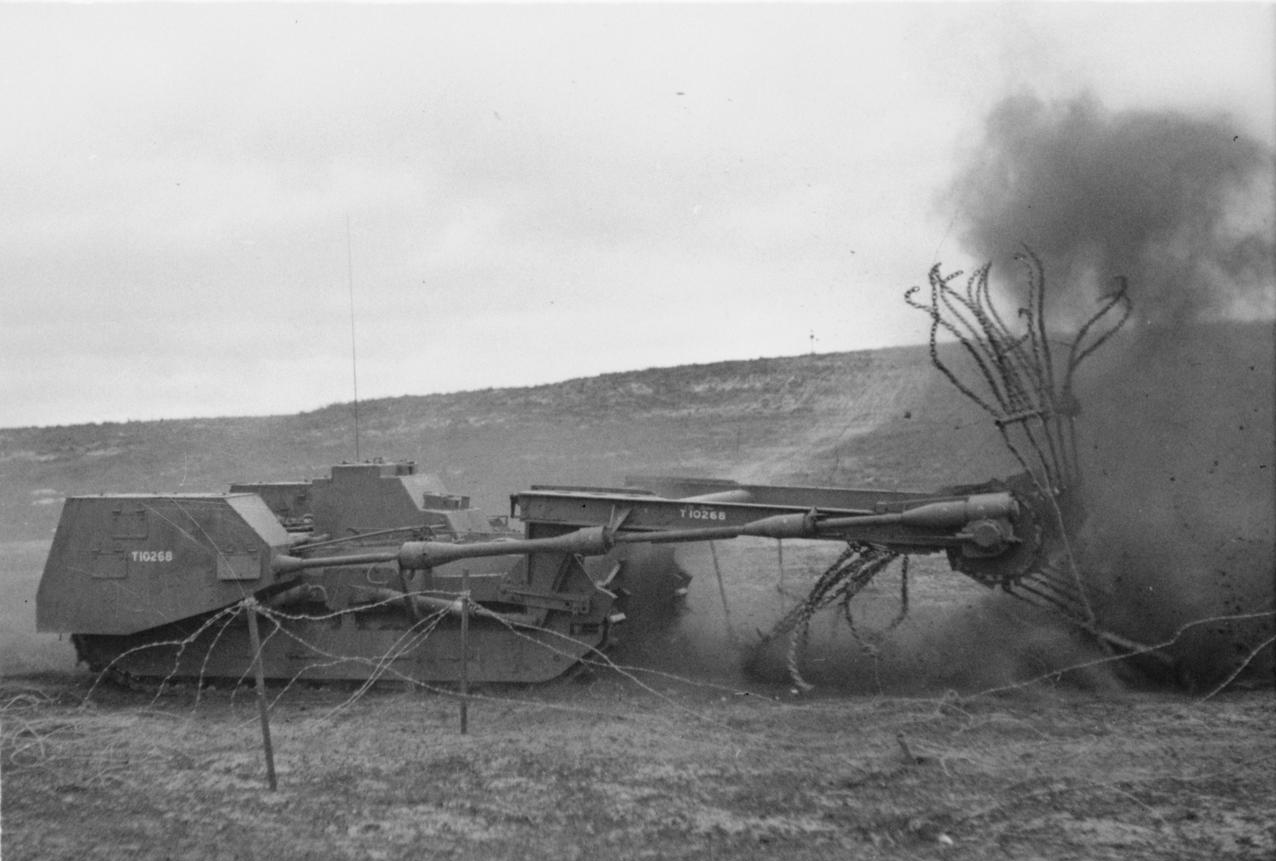
Turretless Matilda Baron under test - 13 August 1943.

Meanwhile, in Britain, du Toit (as unaware of developments in North Africa as they were of his), working with AEC Limited, had developed the Matilda Baron. The Baron's problem was that, like the Scorpion, the rotor was powered by external, auxiliary engines that made it too wide to cross a Bailey bridge and which had to be removed if it was to be transported by rail. Curran Brothers of Cardiff constructed 60 Barons, but they were only used for demonstrations and training.

=== Sherman Crab ===
A number of experimental flail tanks were produced, including the Valentine Scorpion, based on the Valentine tank and several designs based on the M4 Sherman – the Sherman Mark IV and Mark V Scorpions and the "Sherman Lobster". Eventually one of these, the Sherman Crab, went into full production at the request of Major General Hobart and saw active service. Du Toit himself had become a strong advocate of a concept called the perambulator mine flail - a self-contained device with its own engine, that could be pushed ahead of any tank that was available. However, the consensus of opinion favored special-purpose tanks with a permanently mounted flail system and he returned to South Africa in 1943. In 1948, du Toit would receive an award of £13,000 from the Royal Commission on Awards to Inventors for his work on the flail. Nine others (including four South Africans) would share a further £7,000.

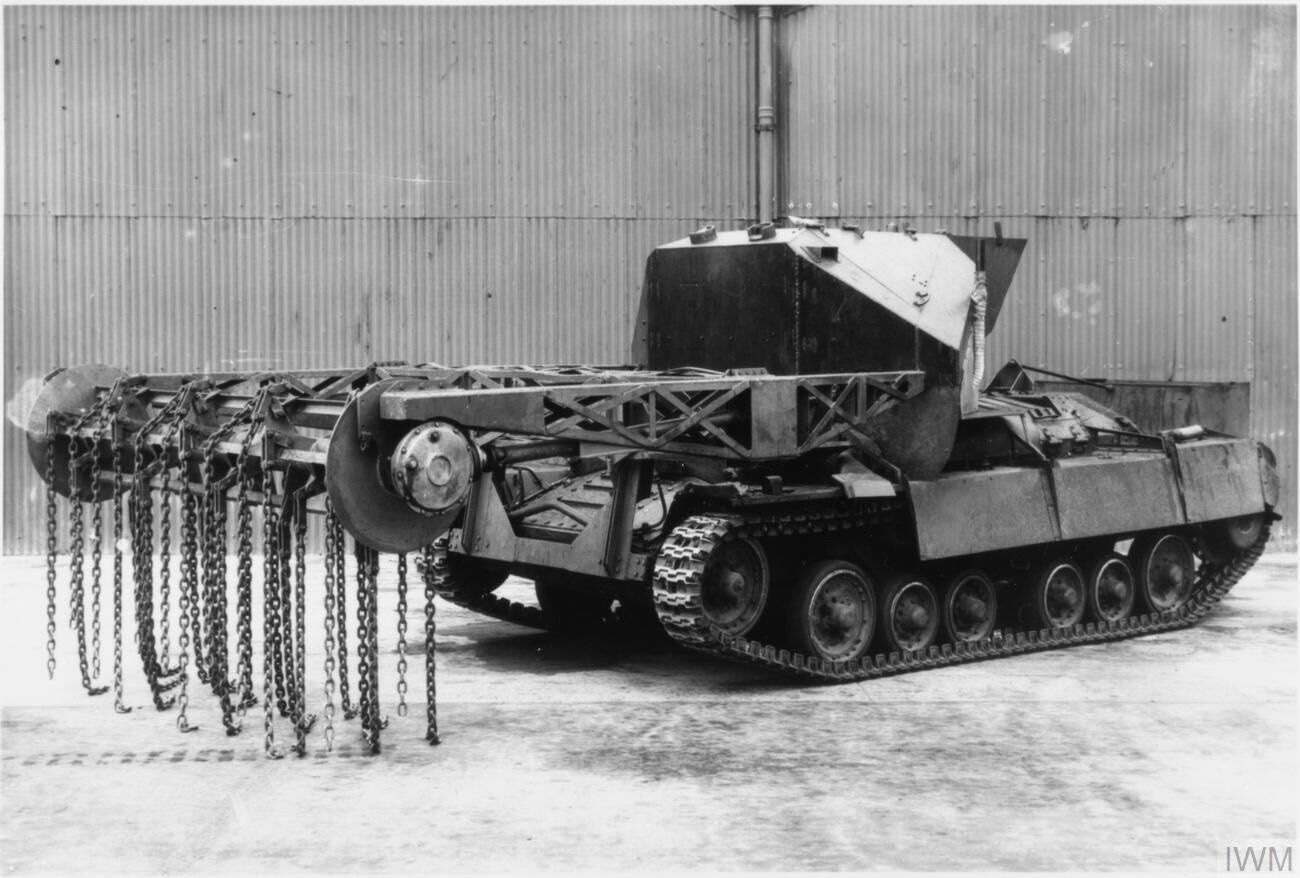
Experimental flail mounted on a Valentine tank; the Valentine Scorpion was never used operationally.

Unlike the Matilda Scorpion and Matilda Baron, the Crab's flail was powered by the main engine, the Sherman's transmission being modified to add a power takeoff and removing the need for an outside, auxiliary engine. The Crab's rotor carried 43 flails and was driven at 142 rpm by a driveshaft running down the right hand side of the tank. The addition of a gearbox was required to maintain the correct flail speed when the tank was traveling slower, such as while climbing.

An innovation was the addition of cutters to the rotor that cut barbed wire and stopped the flail from becoming tangled. This feature made the Crab very effective at tearing up barbed wire obstacles. In the initial Crab design, the flail arms were raised and lowered hydraulically to set the height of the flail. The Mark II version of the Crab, developed as "Contouring Crab", switched to a counterweighted jib that naturally assumed the right height in balance to the force exerted by the rotating flail. This ensured mines buried under a dip in the ground would not be missed. A blast shield between the flail and the tank gave added protection from detonating mines. The hull machine gun was removed, as the blast shield and flail blocked its field of fire. The Crab weighed 32 tons - around two tons more than a normal Sherman.

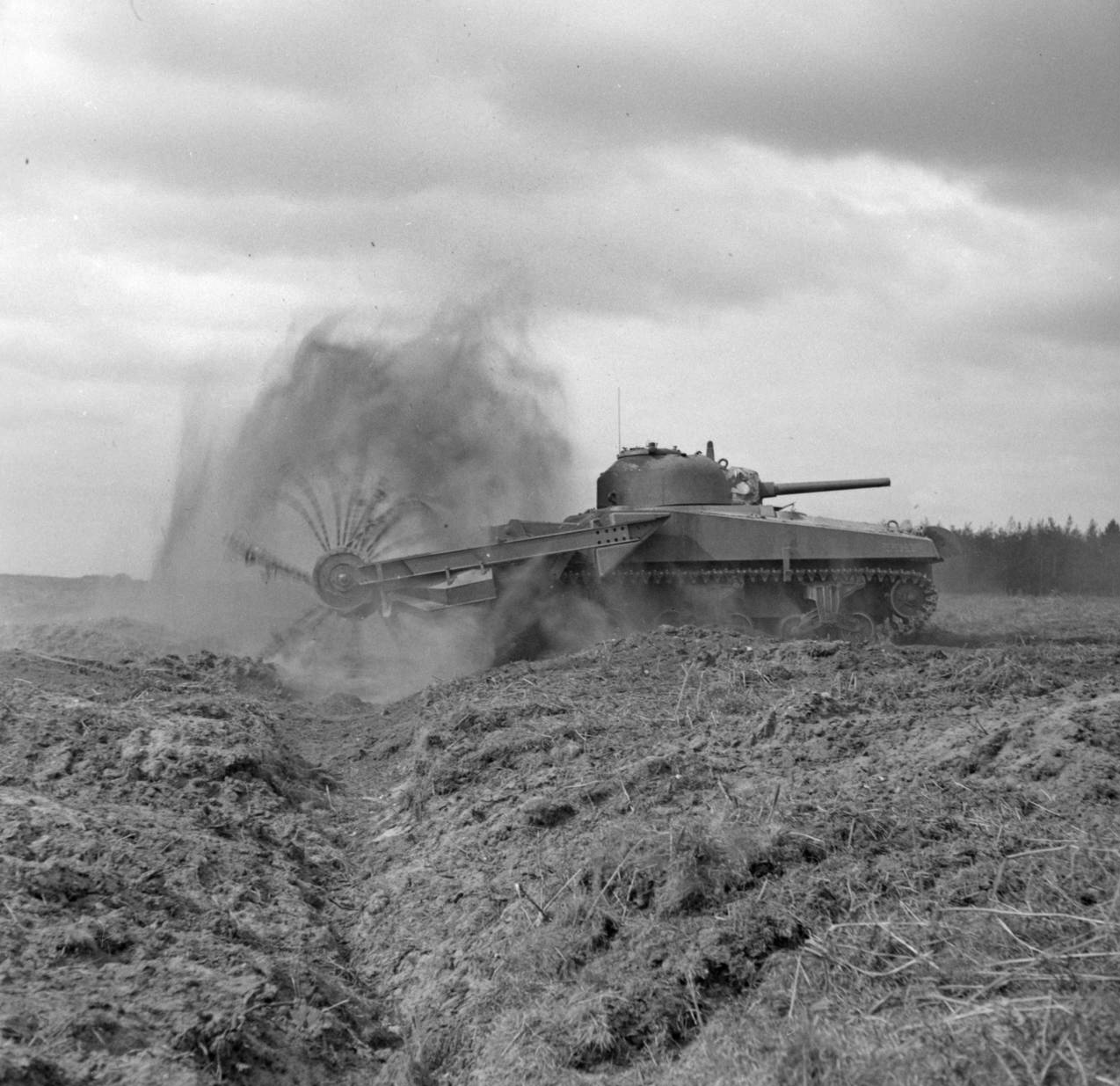
Sherman Crab under test. The flail has been lowered to work in a dip in the ground.

Great attention was paid to marking the cleared path through the mine field. Crabs carried a pair of bins filled with powdered chalk that slowly trickled out to mark the edges of the safe route. They were also equipped with a hopper that periodically dropped smoke grenade markers and a system that automatically fired illuminated poles into the ground at intervals. A pair of lit masts were mounted at the back for station-keeping when several Crabs were flailing together in echelon. Dust clouds reduced visibility to a minimum, and careful control was essential to make sure the tanks' paths did not drift apart, leaving an uncleared strip of ground between them.

In north-west Europe, Crabs were operated by the Lothians and Border Horse, the 22nd Dragoons and the Westminster Dragoons, all of whom were part of the 79th Armoured Division's 30th Armoured Brigade; in Italy, they were operated by the 51st Royal Tank Regiment. A flail squadron of the Royal Armoured Corps, as established on 29 March 1944, comprised seven ordinary Shermans (squadron HQ and a four-tank pilot troop) and four troops of four flail-equipped tanks. In July 1944, the new establishment removed the pilot troop and one of the flail troops; on the plus side, the squadron gained an armoured recovery vehicle. In 1945, in light of experience, each gained a fifth flail tank. Scorpion regiments had been formed of three flail troops.

In combat, the usual tactic was to use Crabs in groups of five. Three would go forward in echelon formation, clearing a broad path through the minefield. The other two would hang back on the flanks and give fire support, but were ready to move forward to replace one of the flailing tanks if it was disabled. The Crab had disadvantages; flailing did not remove all mines. A Teller mine buried up to 5 inches (13 cm) deep would be set off, but the resulting explosion would destroy a single flail chain, which would have to be replaced at some point.

The Crab could only move at 1.25 miles per hour (2 km/h) when flailing, and the gun had to point to the rear, so the tank could not fire even if the gunner could see his target. As with the Scorpion, flailing raised a huge cloud of dust. Despite all this, it was an effective and valuable vehicle during and after D-Day, especially as the Germans made extensive use of minefields to slow the Allied advance through France and the Low Countries. By the final months of the war, German minefields had ceased to be a major problem, and it was proposed that the surviving Crabs should have their flail equipment removed and be converted back to regular Shermans - an idea that was bitterly resented by the Crab crews, who considered themselves to be a highly trained elite. In the end, this never occurred, and the Crabs spent the last part of the war clearing old minefields behind Allied lines.

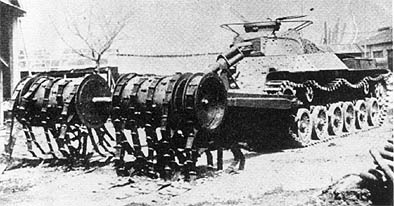
IJA prototype Type 97 Chi-Yu, a copy variant of the Crab

The Sherman Crab saw limited use by the American army; the Crab Mark 1 was designated the Mine Exploder T3 Flail and the Crab Mark II the Mine Exploder T4. The flail idea was also copied by the Japanese, who produced a prototype known as the Type 97 Chi-Yu that was based on a Type 97 Chi-Ha tank. In the 1950s, the British Army used heavily armoured Churchill tanks fitted with flails - this was the Churchill Flail FV3902 or Toad.

== Modern use ==
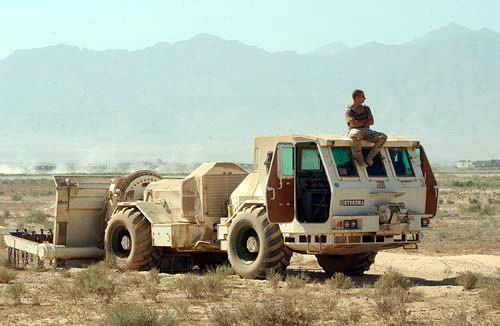
Hydrema 910 mine clearing vehicle in Afghanistan.

Mine flails continue to be used, although their role has changed. During World War II, they were used in combat to clear paths through a defender's minefield during a large-scale assault. The modern equivalents are used both by armies and by non-military organisations engaged in humanitarian demining. Unlike their World War II predecessors, modern mine flails are not intended for use in combat areas; they are unarmed and only carry the armour necessary to protect the operator from mine explosions. Many modern mine-flail vehicles are intended only to destroy anti-personnel mines and receive significant damage if they encounter a larger anti-tank mine. Mine flail vehicles that can cope with anti-tank mines tend to be larger, heavier, more cumbersome and more expensive to operate.

Several designs, such as the Danish Hydrema 910, are based on a truck chassis with an armoured cab and a flail mounted behind on what would otherwise be the cargo space. They are able to drive to the mined site like any other road vehicle. During flailing operations, they slowly drive in reverse over the mine field - in this way, the cab is kept as far as possible from any detonations. Some mine-flail vehicles are operated under remote-control for safety. Similar vehicles of this type are the light MV-4 and medium MV-10 developed by DOK-ING, which are used worldwide by different armies, state agencies, humanitarian organizations and companies. The Swiss Digger DTR D-250 is a smaller, four ton, remote-controlled vehicle that is more easily moved to remote or inaccessible locations and may be used in more confined areas.

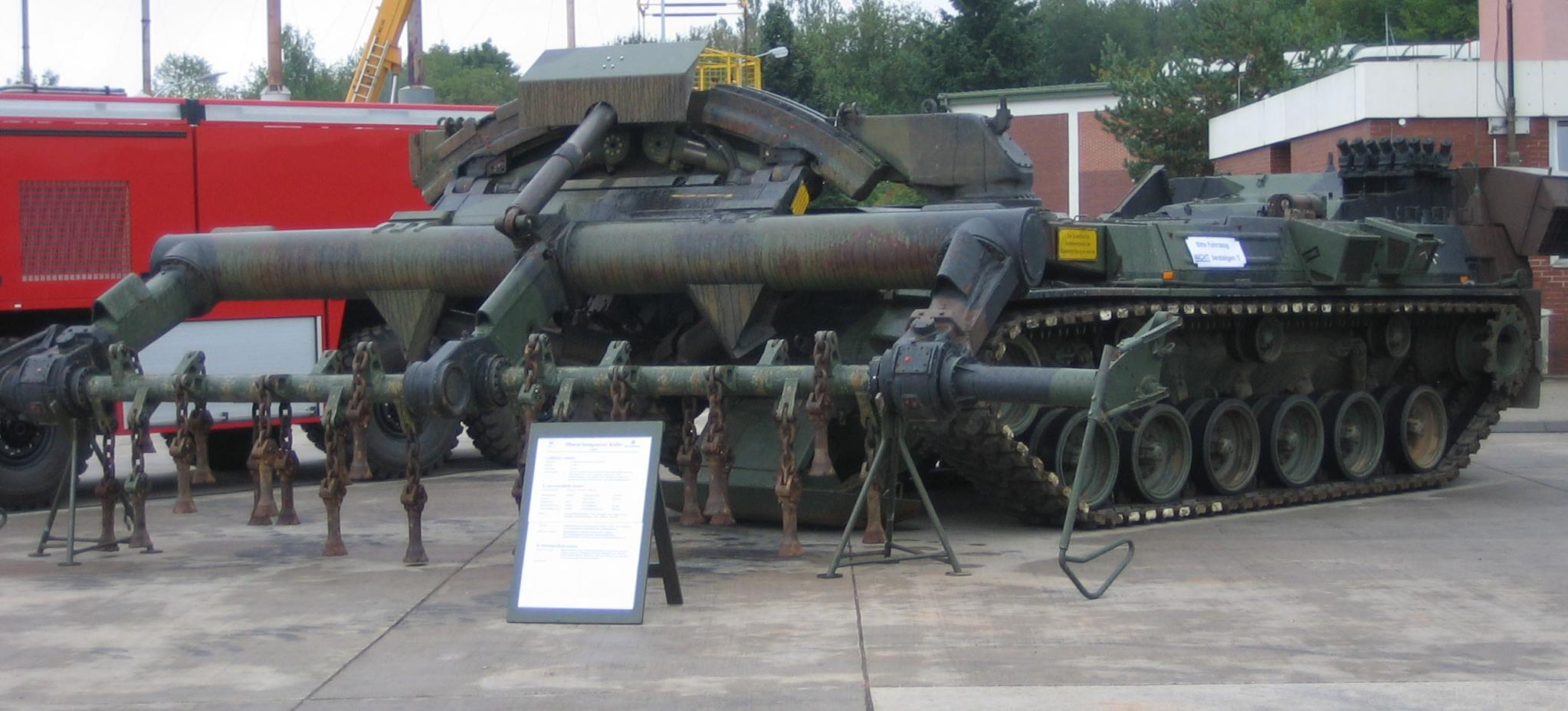
German Army Keiler, flail tank; based on the M48 Patton

Tanks are still used to carry flails; examples include the Norwegian Army's Leopard AMCV – a Leopard tank that was modified by Hagglunds to carry an Aardvark flail system. The German Army is equipped with the Keiler Minenräumpanzer Keiler (mine clearing tank "wild boar"), based on a M48 Patton main battle tank. The first of 24 Keilers was supplied to the German Army by Rheinmetall in 1997.

However, tanks have the disadvantage of having the driver at the front, close to the flail and any explosions, and they can not go slow enough for effective mine clearance. Also, the weight of tanks makes them difficult to transport (by contrast, the 18-ton Hydrema 910 is light enough to be moved by air in a C-130 Hercules.) The tanks used have generally been obsolete models that have been highly modified - some work under remote control, others have had the driver's station moved to the rear. In modern times, there has been little military interest in an updated equivalent of the Sherman Crab or Matilda Scorpion - a substantially unmodified tank still capable of combat. In battle, the modern preference is to detonate mines with explosive devices (mine-clearing line charges), such as the Antipersonnel Obstacle Breaching System or the Giant Viper. During the Gulf War, the U.S. 2nd Marine Division made an attempt to breach an Iraqi mine field with a mine flail mounted on an armored bulldozer. But the flail was destroyed and the bulldozer crippled by an Iraqi anti-tank mine.

Mine flails have the advantage of being able to clear most mines from an area comparatively rapidly - the manufacturer of the British Aardvark Mark 4 quotes a maximum rate of 3,000 square metres (0.74 acres) per hour, however 600 square metres (0.15 acres) per hour is more usual. Also, flails do not place their operators at significant risk, unlike manual demining.

However they have come under criticism. They represent a large cost for non government, humanitarian organisations (an Aardvark Mine flail costs around $500,000 US.) They consume a lot of fuel, as a powerful engine is needed to drive the rotor if the flails are to strike the ground with enough force to be effective. Mine flails can be unreliable and require spare parts that are difficult to obtain in remote regions. This leads to high operating costs and possibly lengthy periods when the flails are out of service.

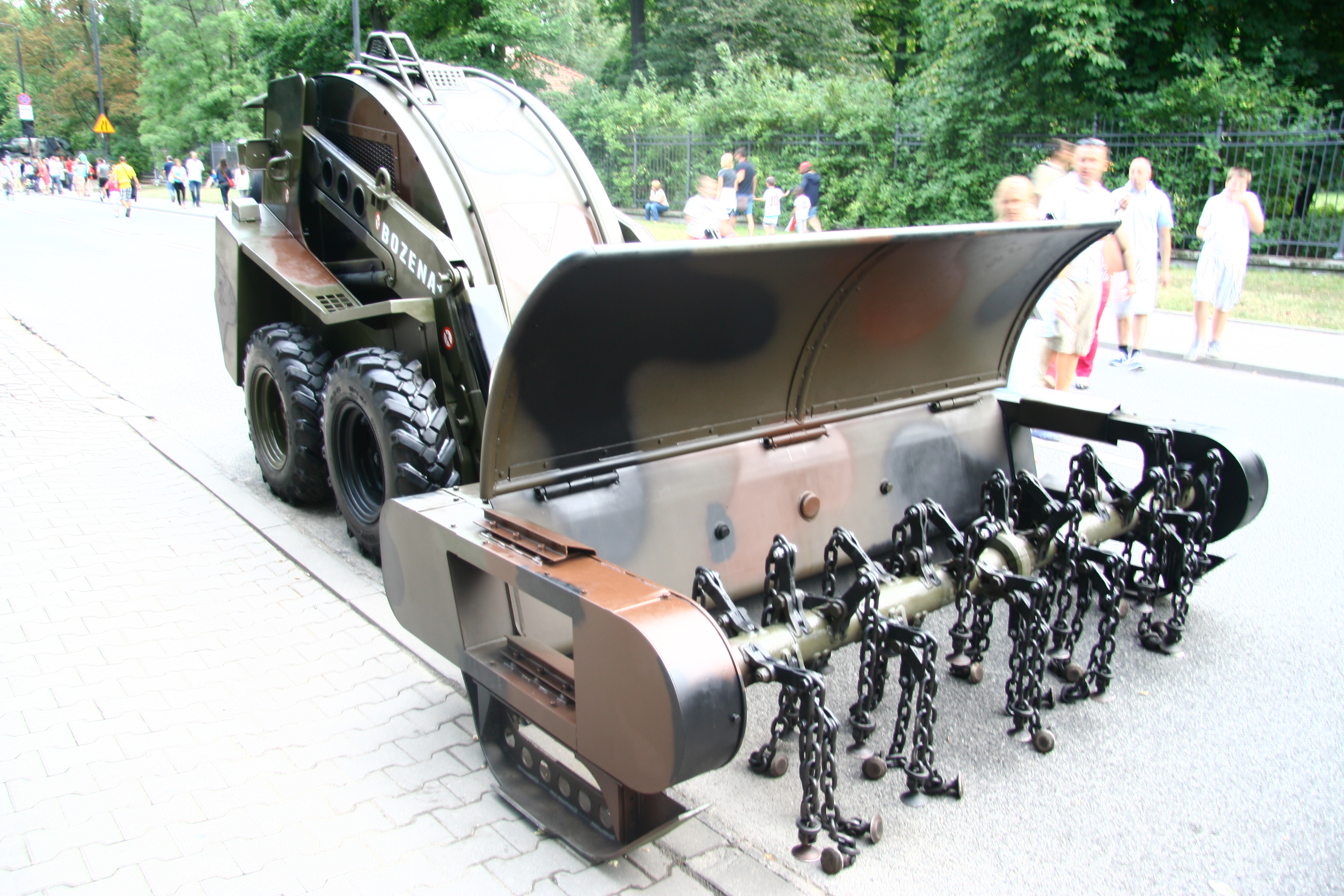
Božena 4 UGV with mine flail in Polish service.

It is known that flails do not reliably detonate all the mines in the area being swept, leaving it potentially hazardous. Some mines, such as the Italian MAT/6 mine, are designed to be flail resistant. Mines that have been buried for many years may become unreliable and fail to detonate when struck, yet they may still be hazardous. Also, some mines are smashed without being detonated. This is referred to as a disruptive strike and still renders the mine harmless, but the ground is contaminated with metal debris and undetonated explosive material. This makes it harder to carry out the necessary manual check of the area after the flail had finished, either with metal detectors or explosive sniffer dogs. There were also anecdotes of mine flails flinging live mines out of the mine field and into safe areas. An experiment with inert mine-analogues demonstrated that this could happen; some mines were thrown over 10 metres (33 ft) by the flail and, in one case, 65 metres (213 ft).

An additional problem is the vulnerability of some current mine flail vehicles to anti-tank mines. This means that, if the presence of anti-tank mines is suspected, the minefield must, paradoxically, be manually checked first to make it safe for the mine flail. These problems have led many humanitarian demining organisations to abandon the use of flails.

The clearance rate of mine flails can approach 100%, although rates as low as 50%-60% have been reported. Effective clearance requires both suitable conditions and experienced flail operators. Current mine flails do not operate effectively on a gradient greater than 30% or on ground that is especially dry or boggy. A large number of rocks, greater than around 5 centimetres (2 in) in diameter, will also hamper flailing, as they will tend to shield mines from flail blows. This is a particular problem in Lebanon, so the United Nations mine clearing operations in the south of that country have barred the use of flails.

Assessing flail effectiveness is difficult, as it is hard to distinguish between a mine that has been missed by the flail and an aged, malfunctioning mine that has been struck but has failed to detonate. To be sure which is the case, it would be necessary to disassemble the mine and examine its fuze - a lengthy and dangerous procedure that is hardly ever carried out in the field. Because of this, all apparently intact mines are reported as being 'missed' by the flail and it has been suggested that this leads to an under-reporting of the mine flail's clearance reliability.

Experience in Afghanistan suggests that, despite the disadvantages, mine flailing can, in certain circumstances, be a valuable step in a multi-stage demining process. They remove most mines, but the area must still be checked manually. This is made easier by the fact that the flails strip most vegetation from the minefield and are very effective at disposing of trip-wire triggered booby trap devices.

In January 2023 the German Bundeswehr donated several Keiler mine clearing vehicles to the Armed Forces of Ukraine for use in demining operations in territory that was recaptured by Ukrainian forces, and in clearing breach paths for armored assaults on Russian front line positions. The frontline of the ongoing Russo-Ukrainian war is now the most heavily mined stretch of land on the face of the earth.

== Museum vehicles ==
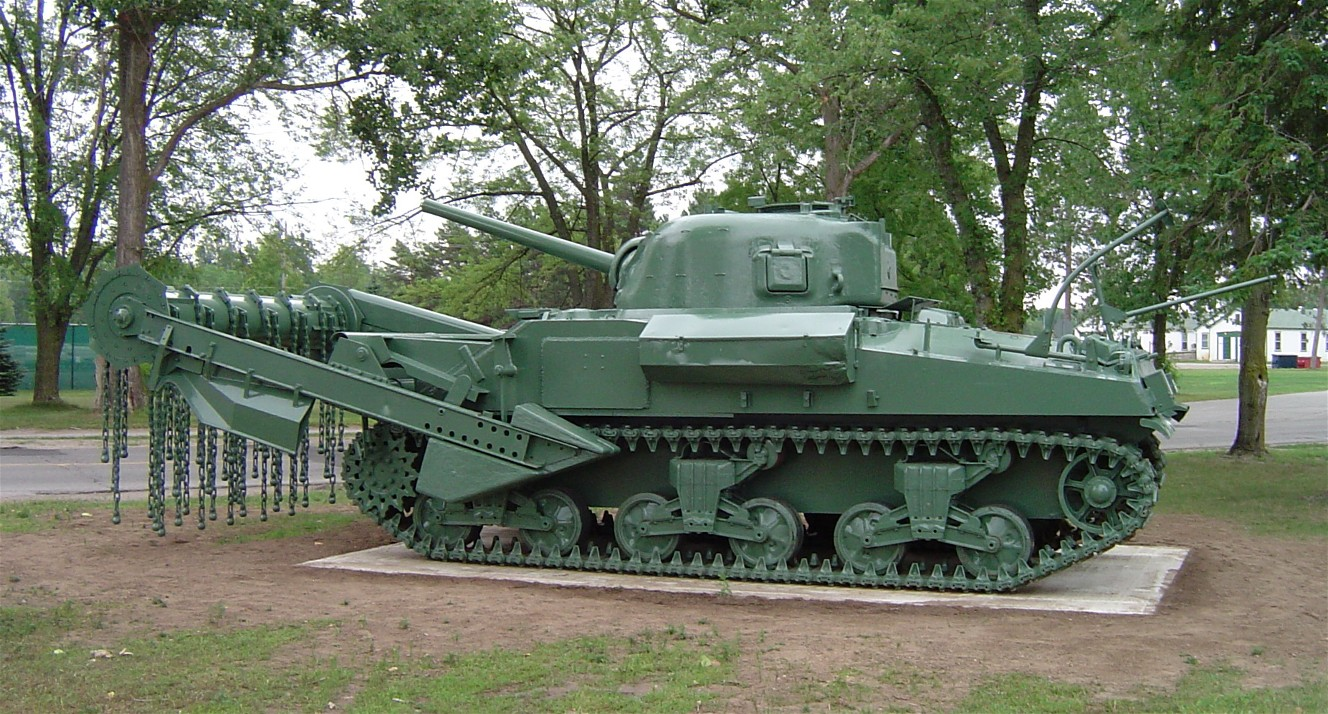
Sherman Crab displayed at the CFB Borden Military Museum, Ontario, Canada.

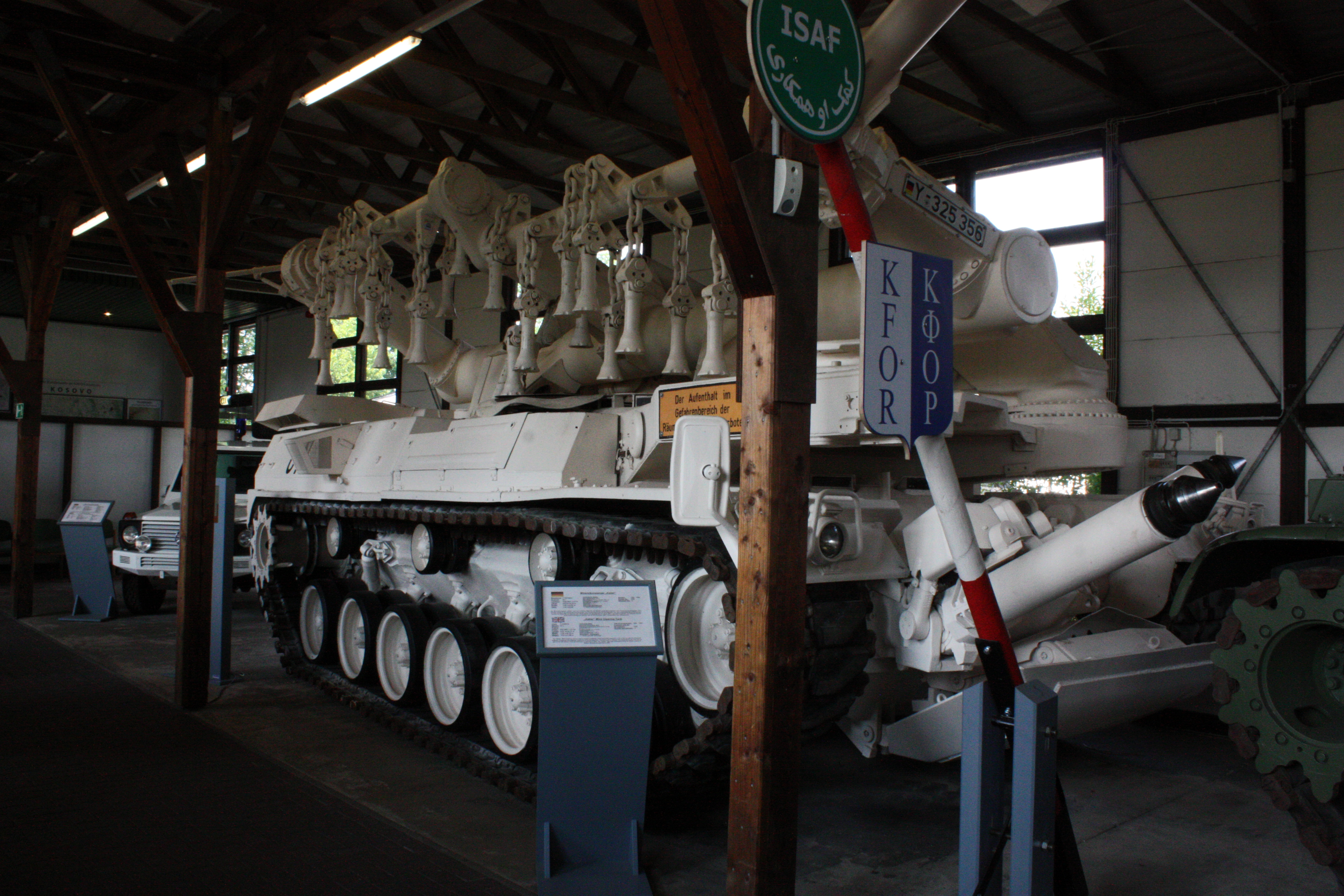
Minenräumpanzer Keiler at the German Tank Museum, Munster (2010)

=== Sherman Crab ===
Sherman Crabs are displayed at the CFB Borden Military Museum, Ontario, Canada; the Yad La-Shiryon museum in Latrun, the Overloon War Museum in the Netherlands; The Tank Museum, Bovington in England; and the Cavalry Tank Museum in Ahmednagar, Maharashtra, India. The Sherman preserved on the seawall at Westkapelle in the Netherlands to commemorate the amphibious assault on Walcheren in November 1944 was originally a Crab, but the flails have been removed.

=== Churchill Toad ===
At one time The Tank Museum, Bovington, had a Churchill Flail FV3902 "Toad" in its collection. However they no longer have it and its present whereabouts are unknown. Another Toad was restored to full working condition in England and in May 2008 was acquired by Jacques Littlefield's Military Vehicle Technology Foundation in California. In 2014, the foundation sold it at auction for US$80,500. The vehicle was bought by the Australian Armour and Artillery Museum; it is currently on public display as part of the museum's collection in Queensland, Australia.

=== Minenräumpanzer Keiler ===
A Minenräumpanzer Keiler is displayed at the German Tank Museum (Deutsches Panzermuseum) near Munster, Germany.

== Mine flail vehicles ==
- Aardvark JSFU
- Bionix Trailblazer
- Sisu RA-140 DS
- Digger DTR
- DOK-ING MV-4
- DOK-ING MV-10

== See also ==
- Demining
- Hobart's Funnies
- Mine plow
- Mine roller
- MineWolf Systems
- Pookie (vehicle)
