= Friedrich Bassler =

German engineer

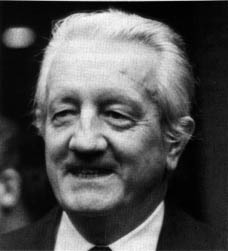
- Born: June 21, 1909; Karlsruhe, Baden-Württemberg, Germany
- Died: September 7, 1992 (aged 83); Freiburg im Breisgau, Baden-Württemberg, Germany
- Education: Karlsruhe Institute of Technology
- Occupation: Hydraulic engineer
- Spouse: Janine (m. 1951)
- Children: 2
- Father: Fritz Bassler

Friedrich Bassler (21 June 1909, Karlsruhe – 7 September 1992, Freiburg im Breisgau) was a German hydraulic engineer.

From 1961 to 1977 he was director of the Institut für Wasserbau und Wasserwirtschaft (Department of water engineering and management) at the Technische Hochschule Darmstadt. From 1964 till 1973 Bassler helped to develop the hydro-solar energy project at the Qattara Depression further. He directed the "Board of Advisers" which was responsible for the planning and financing of the project. For the Egyptian government he served as an advisor on the project.

== Life ==
Friedrich Bassler descended from Alemannic-Swiss forefathers paternally. However, his mother's family originated from Neumark (now in Poland). His father, Fritz Bassler, was an employee with the local newspaper, while his mother took on the role of housewife.

In World War II he was conscripted into the Wehrmacht and was stationed in Egypt in 1941 and 1942. During the German North Africa Campaign he served as a Luftwaffe officer under Field Marshal Rommel in the Western Desert near the Qattara Depression. He sustained a war injury and was captured by the Americans.

He returned to Karlsruhe in 1947, where he became the founder of an engineering company and started working for Schluchseewerk AG at Freiburg. For twelve years he was in charge of planning activities and oversaw construction of tunnels and power plants. Simultaneously he took up the position of Operating Director of a three-stage pumped-storage hydroelectricity plant in the Black Forest. During this Freiburg period, he married Janine in 1951, and they had two children: Michael (1952) and Sibylle (1957).

=== Academic career ===
From 1927, Bassler studied electrical engineering at the Technischen Hochschule Karlsruhe for two semesters, before switching to civil engineering. After the 1932 exams, he became a research fellow. He successfully completed the subsequent traineeship in late 1936. A water management exploration expedition took him to Liberia.

In 1956, he received his doctorate at the 'Technischen Universität Berlin' with his dissertation on „Gesichtspunkte bei der Wahl einer Talsperren-Bauart“ or "Considerations when choosing a dam design". In 1961, he became a professor at the Technische Hochschule Darmstadt. As holder of the then new chair he became director of the "Institut für Wasserbau und Wasserwirtschaft". From 1964 onward, he committed himself to the "Qattara Depression Project" in Egypt. In 1966, he founded the scientific journal Darmstädter Wasserbau-Mitteilungen or, in short, Wasserbau-Mitteilungen. Apart from that he was a member of the planning committee for six years, and chairman from 1967 till 1971.

Besides his activities for the university and his numerous publications and consultancies, he assumed various offices at research and industrial institutes, e.g. at the Deutsche Forschungsgemeinschaft. Guest lectureships took him to Berlin, Madras, Alexandria and Cairo. Additionally he worked on regional models and water management of water-rich and water-poor countries such as Peru, Argentina, Ecuador, India, Saudi Arabia and Egypt. For the OECD and the European Communities he produced studies on the reserves and future needs of water.

In 1977, he retired as professor emeritus, but still kept working as a consultant.

== Qattara Depression Project ==
This project envisaged bringing water from the Mediterranean Sea near El Alamein into the Qattara Depression to generate hydroelectricity. The power plant was to have more output than the Aswan High Dam. Bassler led from 1964 onward the international "Board of Advisers" which was responsible for planning and financing activities of the project. He also advised the Egyptian government on the matter from 1975 onward. He was appointed to make a first preliminary feasibility study by the German Federal Ministry of Economics in Bonn.

Bassler was the driving force behind the Qattara Project for nearly a decade. Halfway through the seventies a team of eight mostly German scientists and technicians was working on the planning of the first hydro-solar depression power station in the world. The first "Bassler-study" of 1973 laid the basis for the Egyptian government to commission a study of its own. It decided in 1975 that Bassler and a group of companies known as "Joint Venture Qattara" should conduct a feasibility study of the project.

The project concept was: Mediterranean water should be channelled through a canal or tunnel towards the Qattara Depression which lies below sea level. This water would then fall into the depression through penstocks for electricity generation. The water would evaporate quickly because of the very dry and hot weather once in the depression. This would allow for more water to enter the depression and would create a continuous source of electricity.

A canal of 60 meters deep would connect the Mediterranean with the depressions edge at this narrow isthmus. This canal would deliver water to the depression as well as being a shipping route towards the Qattara lake with a harbour and fishing grounds in the depression. The depression was to be filled to a height of 60 m below sealevel. It would take a total of 10 years to fill to that level. After that the incoming flow would balance out against the outgoing evaporation and the lake level would stop changing.

In the first phase of the project the Qattara 1 station was to generate 670 Megawatt. The second phase was to generate an additional 1.200 Megawatt. A pumped-storage hydroelectricity facility would increase the peak production capacity with another 4.000 Megawatts, totalling about 6.800 Megawatts.

The core problem of the entire project was the water supply to the depression. Calculations showed that digging a canal or tunnel would be too expensive. Bassler decided to use peaceful nuclear explosions to excavate the canal. Exactly 213 boreholes would each have a nuclear explosive charge of 1,5 Megatons. Everyone of these bombs would have an explosive yield fifty times that of the atomic bomb of Hiroshima.

Evacuation plans cited numbers of at least 25,000 evacuees. Further problems arose with the tectonically unstable Red Sea Rift located just 450 km away from the blast site on which the shockwaves of the explosions would not have remained without result. Also salinization or outright contamination of groundwater had to be counted among the problems because of the salt water Qattara sea. This groundwater is vital to the oases of Bahariya and Siwa.

Another danger was increased coast erosion because sea currents could change in such a way that even very remote coast started to erode. Also a massive demining operation would have to be executed to remove millions of mines and UXOs left from the Second World War.

All this convinced the stakeholders of the project to give up the project especially as the atomic dug canal-idea had to be abandoned because of ecological reasons.

Present day scientists still explore the viability of such a project, as a key to resolving economic, population, and ecological stresses in the area. However interest in the project has waned and as of 2011 has not been undertaken.

== Publications ==
- Die Energiequellen Fluss- und Meerwasser. Institut für Wasserbau und Wasserwirtschaft der Technischen Hochschule Darmstadt, 1977
- „Wasserbaumitteilungen der TH Darmstadt“ 1966–1979
