= January 1965 =

Month of 1965

<<	January 1965					>>
Su	Mo	Tu	We	Th	Fr	Sa
					1	2
3	4	5	6	7	8	9
10	11	12	13	14	15	16
17	18	19	20	21	22	23
24	25	26	27	28	29	30
31

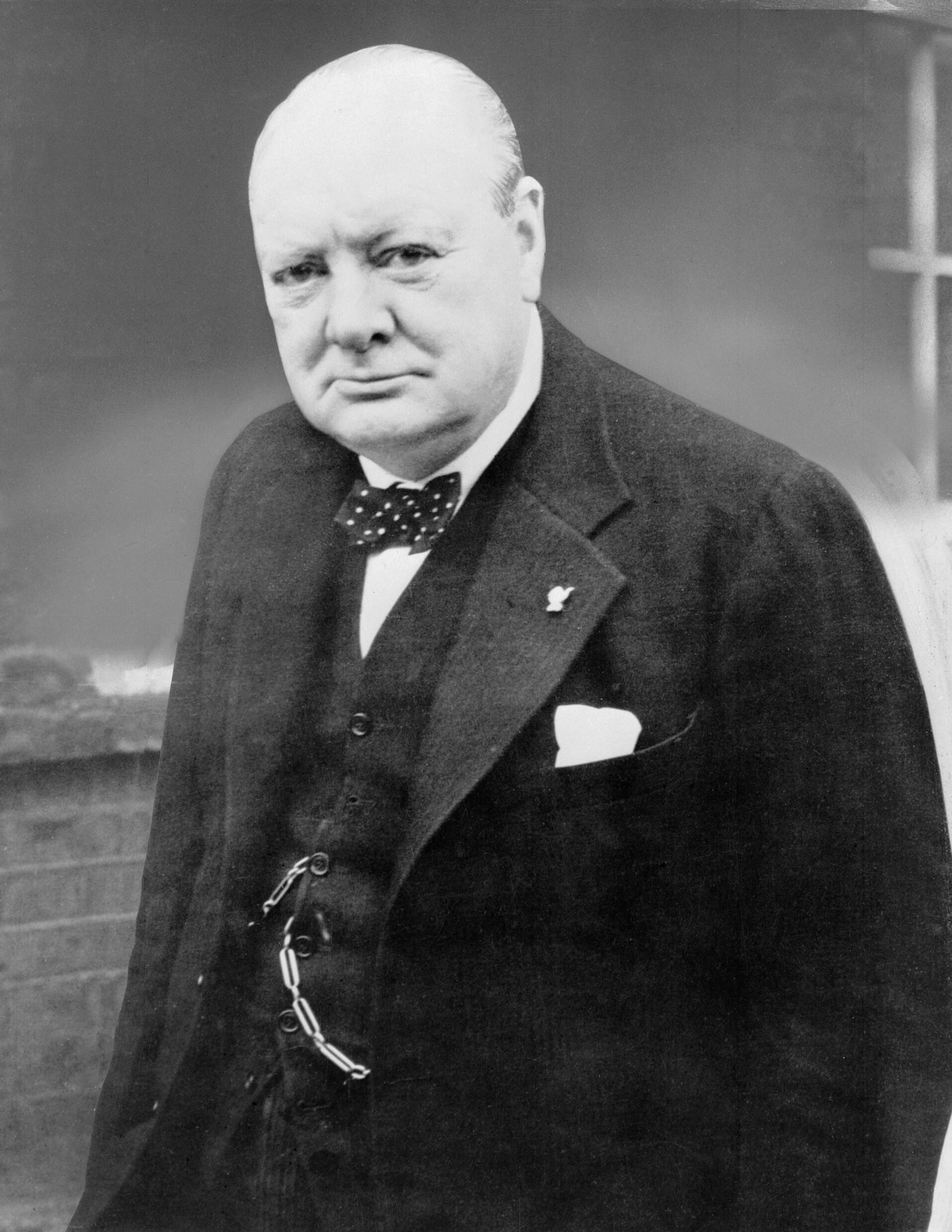
January 24, 1965: Sir Winston Churchill, former UK prime minister, dies aged 90

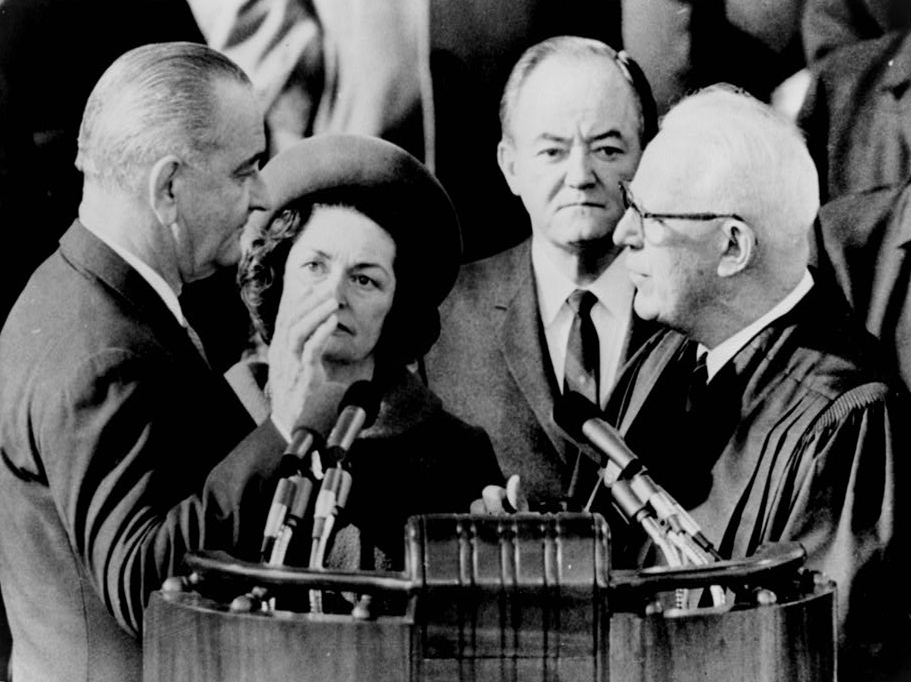
January 20, 1965: U.S. President Johnson inaugurated in Washington

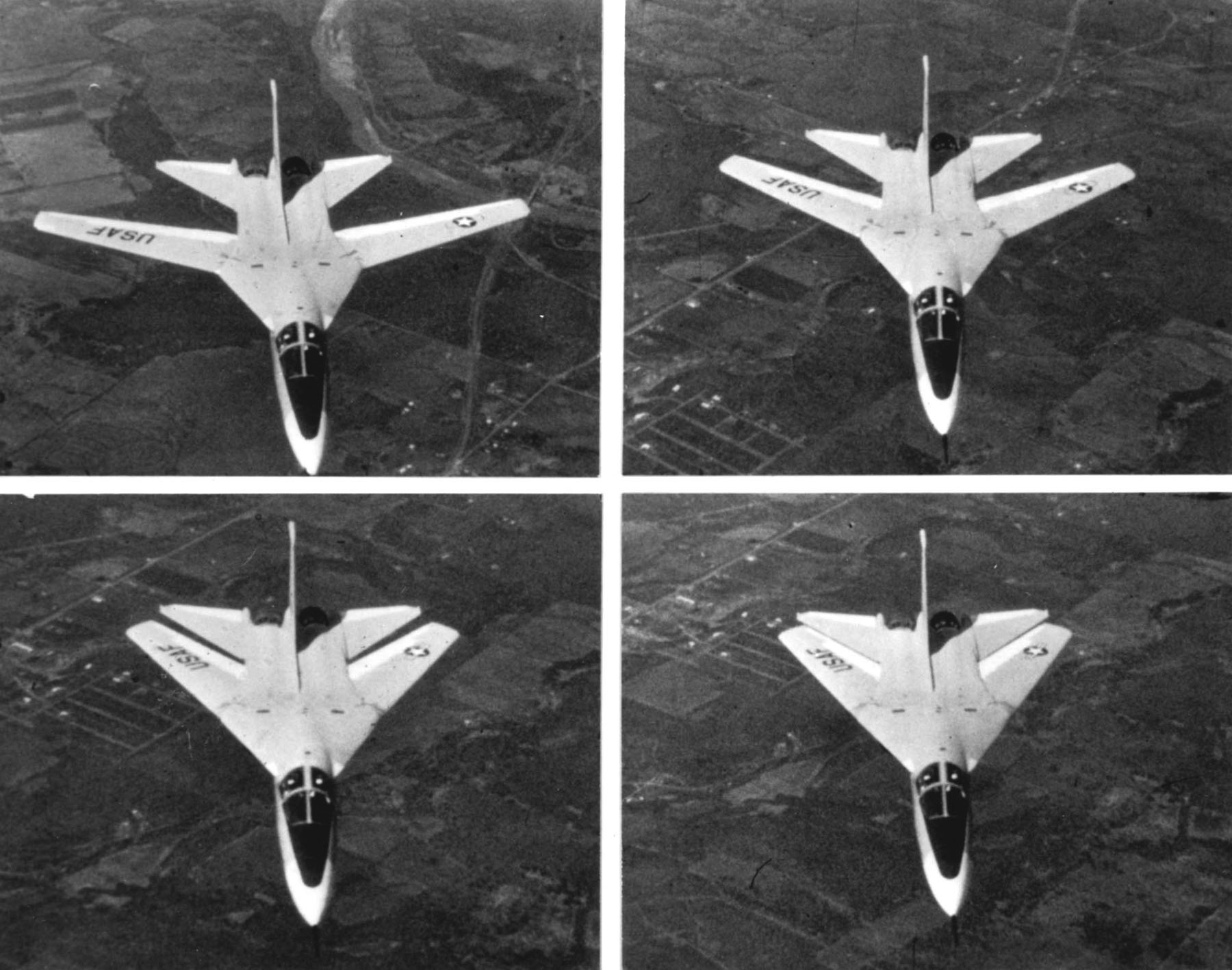
January 6, 1965: F-111, first plane with folding wings, takes flight

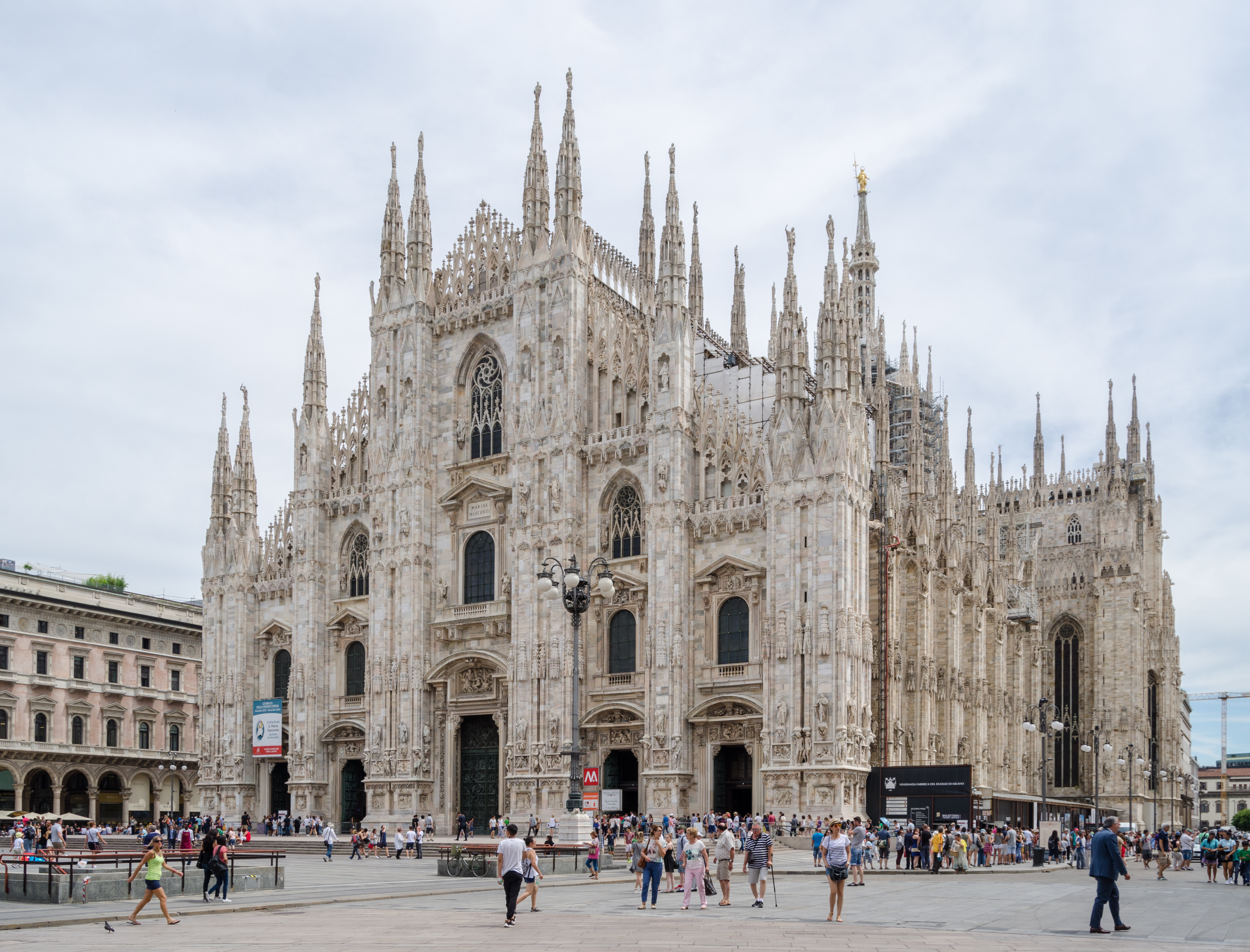
January 6, 1965: Milan Cathedral completed after 567 years

The following events occurred in January 1965:

== January 1, 1965 (Friday) ==
- Fatah, the "Palestinian National Liberation Movement" led by Yasser Arafat, issued its Military Communique No. 1, announcing the formation of a military wing, Al-'Asifah and declaring that it was going to launch a guerrilla action against Israel. Its declared purpose was to show that "the armed revolution is the way to Return and to Liberty" and that the cause of Palestinian reoccupation of the Israeli lands "has not died and will not die." Fatah's first attempt at an attack would come on January 13, when four men rigged an explosive device to water pumps at Beit Netofa Valley water plant and then exchanged gunfire with the Israeli Defense Forces.
- The #1 ranked team in college football, the Alabama Crimson Tide, was beaten by the #3 Texas Longhorns, 21–17, in the Orange Bowl. Meanwhile, the #2 Arkansas Razorbacks rallied to beat the #6 Nebraska Cornhuskers, 10–7, in the Cotton Bowl and remained the only unbeaten major team from 1964. However, since the final Associated Press and United Press International polls had been made at the end of the regular season, Alabama's loss did not affect its #1 standing.
- An hour before he was scheduled to broadcast a nationwide address, Nigeria's President Nnamdi Azikiwe canceled the speech. National elections had been held on December 29, but had been widely boycotted by people who felt they were fraudulent. The text of his address showed that Azkiwe planned to say that he would resign rather than to ask anyone to form a government based on the election results.
- Don Drummond, who was one of the most famous ska musicians in Jamaica, but who also was known to be mentally ill, stabbed and killed his girlfriend, Anita Mahfood, after she returned to their home in Kingston from a nightclub performance. Found to be insane, Drummond was committed to a mental hospital, where he would die four years later.
- Indonesia announced its intention to leave the United Nations, as Indonesian ambassador Lambertus Palar told the news verbally to Secretary General U Thant and UN General Assembly President Alex Quaison-Sackey. No member of the United Nations had quit the organization since its creation in 1945.
- Twenty-two people were killed, and 22 others injured, when their bus overturned near Jalapa in the Veracruz state of Mexico. More might have survived the wreck, but the bus burst into flames after one of the passengers struck a match in order to find his way out of the darkness.
- The Battle of Bình Gia concluded, as the Viet Cong (VC) withdrew while in a superior position. The South Vietnamese Army of the Republic of Vietnam (ARVN) lost 201, while the U.S. had its biggest losses in the Vietnam War up to that time, with five killed.
- Luis Muñoz Marín, Governor of Puerto Rico since 1949, was succeeded in the post after twenty years by Roberto Sánchez Vilella.

== January 2, 1965 (Saturday) ==
- Surgeons at the Oswestry Orthopaedic Hospital in Britain performed the last of several operations on Ann Rowston, a 19-year-old woman who had grown to 6 feet 7 inches (2.01 m) tall because of a pituitary gland disorder. With the removal of four inches from her left femur, preceded by operations to take two inches from her shin bones and four from her right femur, it was hoped that her height could be reduced to slightly over 6 feet (1.8 m) tall. On June 2, eight months after the first surgery had started, Rowston would be recovered sufficiently to leave the hospital on crutches and to begin therapy to resume walking.
- Joe Namath, quarterback for the University of Alabama, signed a three-year contract with the New York Jets of the American Football League (AFL) for an unprecedented $400,000 – the highest amount ever paid to a professional football player. Namath signed at a hotel in Miami, the day after completing his college football career in the Orange Bowl. The deal would prove to be a breakthrough for the AFL in its attempt to compete with the established NFL, and would be a major reason for a major contract offer by the NBC television network for the rights to broadcast the newer league's games.
- In Czechoslovakia, the children's television program Večerníček (featuring a boy of the same name who provides a bedtime story for young children) aired its first episode. The show would celebrate its 50th anniversary in 2015.
- Radio Peking said that the Panchen Lama, who had been removed from office in late 1964 as China's puppet ruler for Tibet, had confessed to conspiring with Tibetan "serf owners" to foment unrest in the former kingdom.
- Denis Healey, the United Kingdom Secretary of Defence, canceled the nation's fighter and military transport programmes and ordered the purchase of the U.S.-built F-4 Phantom and C-130 Hercules in their place.
- The United Kingdom airlifted 1,200 British paratroopers, infantrymen and sailors to Singapore in order to help guard Malaysia from a threatened attack by Indonesia.
- Mohammed Ayub Khan was re-elected as President of Pakistan, defeating challenger Fatima Jinnah, the 76-year-old sister of Pakistan's founder Mohammed Ali Jinnah.
- Martin Meyerson replaced Edward Strong as acting chancellor of U.C. Berkeley, betokening a shift of policy towards the campus Free Speech Movement.
- The long-running British TV sports series World of Sport was launched.

== January 3, 1965 (Sunday) ==
- The collapse of a Roman Catholic church in Rijo, a town in the Mexican state of Puebla, killed 57 people and injured 61 others during the first Sunday services in the new building. Twenty of the victims were children, and 100 other children were left as orphans by the disaster.
- Jed Johnson Jr., elected U.S. Representative for Oklahoma in November at the age of 24, became the youngest member of Congress in modern times when he was sworn into office one week after reaching the required minimum age of 25 on December 27.
- The first German airbase on foreign soil since the end of World War II opened, when West Germany's Luftwaffe began joint-operation with the Portuguese Air Force of a base 110 miles (180 km) from Lisbon.
- In his first public appearance of the year, Pope Paul VI gave a homily at a Mass for the Italian University.
- Syria announced nationalization of foreign-controlled industries.
- Died:
  - Semyon Kosberg, 61, Soviet Jewish aviation and rocket engineer, Hero of Socialist Labor and four time awardee of the Order of Lenin
  - Milton Avery, 79, American modern art painter

== January 4, 1965 (Monday) ==
- As the new U.S. Congress opened, Republican members of the U.S. House of Representatives voted, 73–67, to replace 64-year-old minority leader Charles A. Halleck of Indiana with a younger candidate, 51-year-old Representative Gerald R. Ford of Michigan. "If Ford had not made that run against Halleck", longtime friend and aide Donald Rumsfeld would write later, "he would not have become the House Republican leader, nor would he later have been selected by President Nixon as vice president when Spiro Agnew had to resign. Indeed, it can probably be said that the man who was never elected president by the American people became president of the United States by the narrow margin he received to become House minority leader on January 4, 1965."
- Members of the Mississippi Freedom Democratic Party, a group of several hundred protesters, mostly African-American, asked the House of Representatives to disqualify four Democrats and one Republican who had been elected to represent Mississippi in the House in November, on the grounds that the MFDP's candidates had been illegally kept off the ballot. On the motion of New York Congressman William F. Ryan, the five stood aside while the representatives from the other 49 states were sworn in, and a roll call vote was taken. The House voted 277 to 148 to administer the oath to their five Mississippi colleagues.
- Rubén Olivares began his professional boxing career in a bout in Cuernavaca, Mexico, knocking out Isidro Sotelo in the first round. Olivares would enter the Hall of Fame as one of the hardest punching boxers of all time and would win almost three-quarters of his fights by knockouts, including his first 24 bouts and 50 of his first 53. He would reign as the world bantamweight champion between 1969 and 1972, and the world featherweight champion briefly during 1974, and 1975.
- Deactivation of America's Titan I missiles began less than three years after they had first become operational on April 18, 1962. The 144 Titans had been deployed at five air force bases in the Western United States, and the first to be taken off of alert were those at Beale Air Force Base in California. The ICBMs, which had to be raised out of their silos for fueling before they could be launched, had been made obsolete by the new Minuteman missiles.
- Sixty-four of the 103 people on Aeroflot Flight SU-101 were killed when the plane crashed while attempting to land at the Alma-Ata airport in the Kazakh SSR in the Soviet Union, after departing from Semipalatinsk as part of a multi-stop flight that had originated in Moscow. The pilot had attempted to land during poor visibility, and brought the Ilyushin 18B turboprop down into trees about 600 feet (180 m) to the right of the runway.
- The U.S. House of Representatives voted 224–201 to revise its rules in order to prevent the House Rules Committee from blocking legislation that it opposed. Under the new system, if a bill had not been cleared by the Rules Committee within 21 legislative days, the Speaker of the House was authorized to remove it directly to the entire House for a vote.
- U.S. President Lyndon B. Johnson announced his plans for the "Great Society" during his State of the Union Address. Johnson spoke at 9:00 in the evening Eastern time, setting a precedent for the annual State of the Union speech to be seen in "prime time"; with few exceptions, previous addresses had generally been given in the afternoon.
- Born: Julia Ormond, English film and television actress; in Epsom, Surrey
- Died: T. S. Eliot, 76, American-born British writer, and 1948 winner of the Nobel Prize in Literature, died from emphysema.

== January 5, 1965 (Tuesday) ==
- The Renault 16 was introduced at a press conference on the French Riviera, three months before it was to be made available to the public.
- Dempsey Bruton, a NASA engineer at the flight facility at Wallops Island, Virginia, filed a report of an unidentified flying object (UFO) leading to an investigation by the U.S. Air Force. The incident would be embellished in later years, with descriptions of a NASA satellite tracking station that "calculated its speed at 6,000 mph" and witnesses in downtown Washington, D.C., later seeing "strange, disclike objects zigzagging effortlessly north to south across the sky toward the Capitol building."
- An 18-year-old man and three teenage boys were found dead inside their cell in the city jail in Payson, Arizona. The young men, who had been arrested the night before for petty theft, had not been checked upon until 10:30 the next morning. The only inmates, all four were victims of carbon monoxide poisoning from a faulty space heater.
- Che Guevara of Cuba met in Brazzaville with MPLA leader (and future President of Angola) Agostinho Neto to discuss Cuban aid in the MPLA's fight to liberate Angola from Portuguese control.
- The People's Republic of China and Tanzania signed an agreement for a loan of ten million British pounds from China, and Chinese aid of £3,000,000 to build a fully integrated textile mill.
- The Firestone Tire and Rubber Company announced an agreement with Romania for Firestone to design and equip a synthetic rubber plant in the Communist republic.
- The Fender Musical Instruments Corporation was sold to CBS for $13,000,000.
- NASA Headquarters began the Gemini 3 flight plan to cover the possibility of retrorocket failure, with a goal of ensuring safe reentry of the astronauts even if they couldn't fire the retrorockets to slow their descent. The solution was to incorporate three orbit attitude maneuvers to establish a fail-safe orbit from which the spacecraft could reenter the atmosphere whether the retrorockets fired or not. The proposal would become part of the flight plans for Gemini 3 and Gemini 4.
- Born:
  - Patrik Sjöberg, Swedish Olympic high jumper who held the world record from 1987 to 1988 after clearing 2.42 meters (7'11.3"); in Gothenburg
  - Vinnie Jones, English-born soccer star who captained the Wales national team; in Watford, Hertfordshire
- Died: Billy Wade, 34, American stock car racer and 1963 NASCAR Rookie of the Year, was killed when he was testing tires for the Goodyear Tire Company at the Daytona International Raceway. When he entered a turn at 170 miles per hour (270 km/h), the right front tire blew and he crashed into a wall.

== January 6, 1965 (Wednesday) ==
- The General Dynamics F-111 Aardvark, the first aircraft that could fold and unfold its wings while in flight, made its first successful flight. Richard L. Johnson and Val E. Pruhl, test pilots for General Dynamics, were the flight crew on the expensive fighter-bomber. Johnson commented later, "For the first time, with wing sweep, we can have an airplane with supersonic performance that, at the same time, does not need a concrete lake to land upon." During the flight, "the wings were swept from the 16-degree full-forward position to the 72.5-degree full aft position".
- U.S. Senator Karl Mundt of South Dakota introduced a proposed amendment to the U.S. Constitution that would reform the electoral college system that had been in place since 1789. Under the Mundt proposal, which would fail in the Senate, the presidential candidate with the plurality of popular votes in a particular state would not necessarily win all of the state's electoral votes. Mundt's idea was to award one electoral vote for each congressional district where a candidate finished first, with two additional electoral votes to the overall winner of a particular state.
- Construction of Milan Cathedral was completed after 567 years, with the installation of the last of its massive bronze doors. Giovanni Colombo, the Archbishop of Milan, blessed the event with the words, "May this door be one to hope and salvation."
- Hassan al-Amri, "the General of Yemen", became Prime Minister of the Yemen Arab Republic for the second time, in a military government.

== January 7, 1965 (Thursday) ==
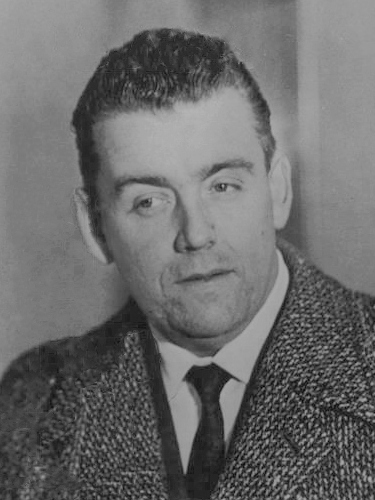
Thompson

- Robert Glenn Thompson, a gasoline station owner and former U.S. Air Force clerk who had sold photos of secret documents to the Soviet Union, was arrested at his fuel-oil distribution service station at Bay Shore, New York. After pleading guilty to espionage, Thompson was sentenced to 30 years in prison and would spend more than 13 years at the federal penitentiary in Lewisburg, Pennsylvania before being released on May 1, 1978, by the U.S. to East Germany as part of a prisoner exchange between the two nations.
- The town of Simacota, located in the Santander Department in northeastern Colombia, was seized by more than 100 members of the new Ejército de Liberación Nacional (ELN), the "National Liberation Army"). The invaders murdered three of Simacota's four policemen, robbed the local bank, harassed the townspeople and looted the local pharmacy of its medicines, before being driven out by the Colombian Army. Only three of the 100 ELN men were captured.
- The Bank of France demanded that the United States Treasury convert French holdings of $150,000,000 worth of United States dollars into gold. The U.S. had honored two previous requests for smaller amounts in 1962 and 1963. France's move came in light of the Finance Ministry's report that France had only 70% of its optimal gold reserve to back up its own currency.
- Identical twin brothers Ronnie and Reggie Kray, 31, were arrested on suspicion of running a protection racket in London.

== January 8, 1965 (Friday) ==
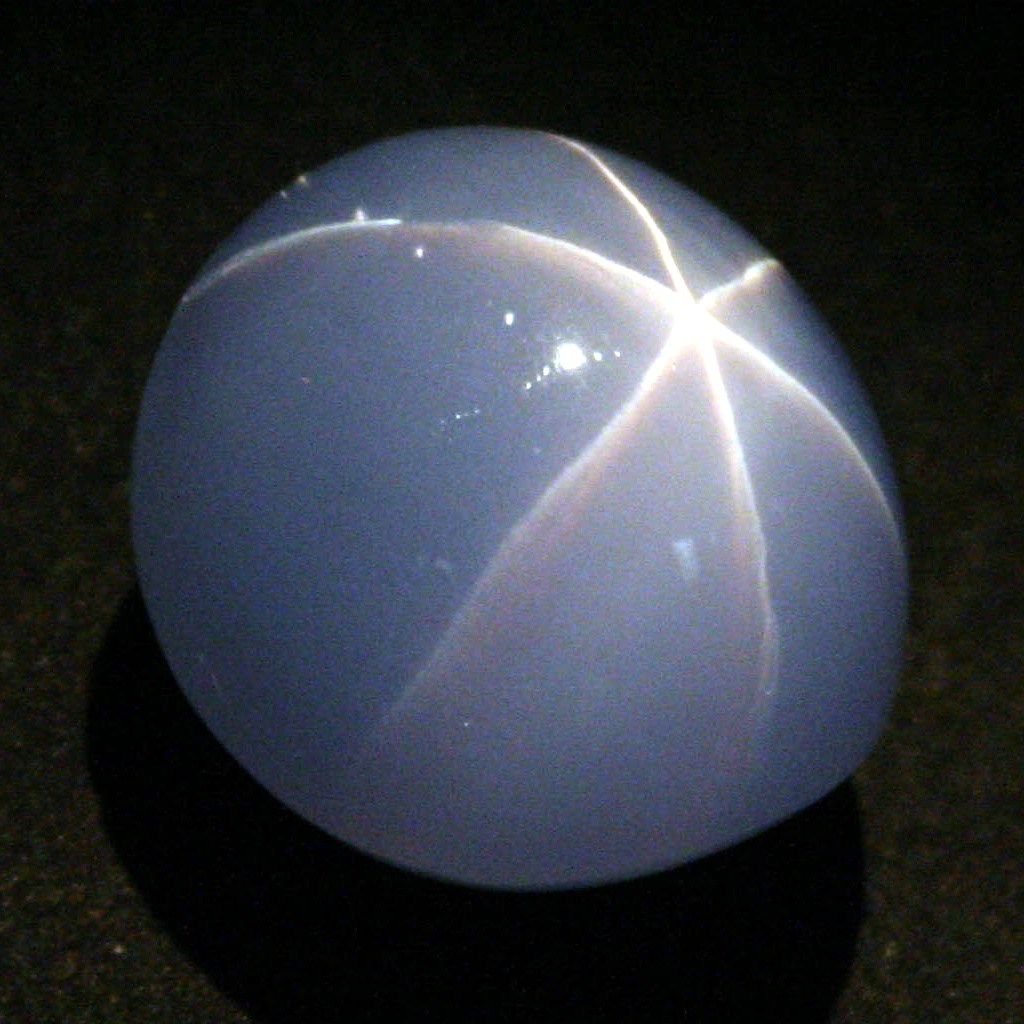
Star of India

- The Star of India, missing since a robbery that occurred on October 29, 1964, of the American Museum of Natural History in New York, was found along with eight other priceless jewels after suspect Allen Kuhn led detectives to a bus station in Miami. Kuhn and his partners in crime had placed the gems in "a damp and moldy bag" and hidden them in one of the station's lockers.
- The 1965 PGA Tour began with the Los Angeles Open golf tournament at Rancho Park Golf Course.

== January 9, 1965 (Saturday) ==
- The "Hope Slide", the largest landslide in Canada's history, buried British Columbia Highway 3 under 47 million cubic meters (1.66 billion cubic feet) of rock at 7:00 in the morning. Four people died when their vehicles, a convertible car and a hay truck, were buried in the debris, while a Greyhound bus driver was able to back up quickly before he and his passengers were caught in the avalanche. Two of the bodies from the hay truck were recovered, while two others remain entombed in a pile of rock and mud as high as 85 meters (280 feet) and three kilometers (almost two miles) wide. Mountain truck driver Norman Stephanishin had spotted an earlier fall of rocks across the highway, and had warned five people to get away, but only one, a young woman, had chosen to leave with him. "I just don't think they quite realized what I was talking about", he would say later. Stephanishin then encountered the bus, carrying a dozen passengers, and the driver, David Hughes, "backed the bus at full speed for 1 1/2 miles along the twisting, dark highway while most of his passengers slept."
- Major Wang Shi-chuen of the Republic of China Air Force was captured alive after his U-2 spy plane was shot down during an attempt to photograph the Baotou (Paotow) uranium enrichment plant in the People's Republic of China. He would remain a prisoner for nearly 18 years, before being released in Hong Kong in November 1982.
- The Malaysian patrol ship Sri Perak fired upon and sank an Indonesian tugboat that was apparently attempting to land guerrillas on the coast near Port Dickson. Sixteen survivors were rescued and taken prisoner, but it was believed at least 40 more had gone down with the ship.
- The British comedy series Not Only... But Also premiered on BBC Two, hosted by Dudley Moore and Peter Cook, with special guests John Lennon and Norman Rossington, and musical guest Diahann Carroll.
- The Mirzapur Cadet College formally opened for academic activities in East Pakistan (now Bangladesh).
- Born:
  - Joely Richardson, English TV and film actress; in Marylebone, as the daughter of actress Vanessa Redgrave and film director Tony Richardson
  - Farah Khan, Indian film choreographer and director; in Mumbai

== January 10, 1965 (Sunday) ==
- Twenty-one African-American players from the American Football League said that they would not play in the league's all-star game in New Orleans, scheduled for January 16. The night before, players had been refused admittance to the same French Quarter night clubs that their white teammates had gone into, were unable to get taxicabs to stop for them, and had insults shouted at them. The 21 men met at the Roosevelt Hotel, where the East team was staying, and a majority voted not to play, according to Buffalo's Ernie Warlick, who served as the group's spokesman. The game would be rescheduled the next day in Houston.
- Exactly a month after his last public appearance, former British Prime Minister Winston Churchill suffered a severe stroke that would lead to his death two weeks later. Earlier that evening, Churchill was partaking of his "nightly ritual of brandy and cigars" and remarked to his son-in-law, Christopher Soames, "It has been a grand journey, well worth making... once." Though he would sometimes regain consciousness and be able to talk, Churchill would remain paralyzed until his passing on January 24.
- Born: Butch Hartman, American animator, illustrator, and voice actor known for creating The Fairly OddParents and Danny Phantom; in Highland Park, Michigan
- Died:
  - Frederick Fleet, 77, British member of the crew of the RMS Titanic who had been the first to sight the iceberg that ultimately sank the ship in 1912.
  - Antonín Bečvář, 63, Czech astronomer who created the compilation of star charts that were in international use from 1951 to 1981.

== January 11, 1965 (Monday) ==
- A telephone conversation between future U.S. National Security Adviser and Secretary of Defense Frank Carlucci and another American diplomat, Robert Gordon, was recorded by intelligence officers in Tanzania, and Zanzibari and Tanzanian analysts concluded that the two had been discussing a military intervention in Zanzibar, codenamed "Second Twelfth". Gordon and Carlucci would maintain that "second twelfth" meant only their plans to recommend U.S. President Johnson to send congratulations to Zanzibar's President Abeid Karume in time for a celebration of the Zanzibar Revolution on February 12, and that Gordon's statement that he was going to "need more ammunition" had only been a misunderstood American colloquialism. The Tanzanians doubted the explanation, and Carlucci and Gordon would be expelled.
- A California teenager, 16-year-old Tom Tawzer, became only the second person known to survive a drop from San Francisco's Golden Gate Bridge. Up until then, there had been 278 fatal plunges from the bridge. Tawzer, from Livermore, leaped or fell 236 feet (72 m) and landed in the path of an ocean freighter, and a patrolman used flares to wave the ship off in time. Despite some internal injuries and a broken clavicle, Tawzer was able to swim to a Coast Guard crew that was coming to his rescue.
- The serial killer who had been dubbed "Jack the Stripper" killed his final known victim. During a 14-month period, the corpses of at least six young prostitutes in London, partially or fully undressed, were found in the area. All had been strangled or drowned. Bridget O'Hara was last seen alive on January 11, and her body would not be located until February 16. Two men who committed suicide during the spring of 1965 would be considered suspects, but the crime was never solved.
- Commander Henry T. Stanley, a U.S. Navy pilot, died after staying with a falling jet-trainer so that he could steer it away from residences in Fremont, California. The jet, co-piloted by Lt. Commander Harford Field, had taken off from the aircraft carrier USS Midway (CV-41) and narrowly missed colliding with Mission San Jose High School and area homes, before impacting on a large vacant lot. Field ejected to safety on orders from Stanley.
- Sixty thousand members of the International Longshoremen's Association walked out on strike on American ports on the East Coast and the Gulf Coast, from Maine to Texas. During the strike, estimated to cost shipping and receiving companies $20,000,000 per day, ships in port could not be unloaded or loaded.
- The experimental XC-142, a four-engine tiltwing aircraft, made its first successful test of an inflight transition from horizontal to vertical wing position and back again. However, the project would be canceled after only five prototypes were built, and the XC-142 would never be put into regular operation.
- At a hangar in Santa Monica, California, the Douglas Aircraft Company unveiled its new commercial jet airplane, the Douglas DC-9, billed as the "first American lightweight twin jet commercial transport".
- HMS Eagle, an aircraft carrier described as the British Royal Navy's most formidable warship, arrived at Singapore to become part of a 70-ship defence for Malaysia in the event of an attack from Indonesia.
- West Germany's Bundestag lifted all restrictions against the televising of parliamentary sessions.
- Died:
  - A. V. Alexander, 79, British official who served as First Lord of the Admiralty during World War II, and later as the British Minister of Defence
  - Wally Pipp, 71, American MLB player who was in 1,872 games, and was home-run champion of the American League in 1916 and 1917, but who was most known for losing his regular Yankees' first-baseman job to Lou Gehrig.

== January 12, 1965 (Tuesday) ==
- The NERVA Program (Nuclear Engine for Rocket Vehicle Application) conducted a test near Los Alamos, New Mexico, to determine the consequences of "the most devastating accident possible" for a nuclear reactor. With measuring instruments, including high-speed cameras to gather data, the U.S. Atomic Energy Commission used a nuclear rocket engine and applied an electrical power surge to make its reactor overheat, in order to simulate "a runaway reactor". The temperature rose to more than 4,000 °C (over 7,200 °F) before the reactor burst "sending fuel hurtling skyward and glowing every color of the rainbow". Pieces of radioactive fuel as large as 148 pounds (67 kg) were thrown upward, including a 98-pound (44 kg) portion that landed 400 yards (370 m) away, and a radioactive cloud blew over Los Angeles and out to sea.
- U.S. President Johnson presented a proposal to Congress for what he called the "national goal of Full Educational Opportunity", a reform of American education at all levels, "from preschool through graduate study", with a suggested appropriation of 1.5 billion dollars of federal financial assistance to school districts. Within less than 90 days, the new Congress would pass the Elementary and Secondary Education Act (ESEA), which would be signed into law on April 11 at a one-room schoolhouse where Johnson had been a teacher in the 1930s.
- The bodies of two 15-year-olds, Christine Sharrock and Marianne Schmidt, were found at Wanda Beach near Sydney, in a crime that shocked Australians because of the victims' age and the brutality of their slashing. The crime remains unsolved after more than half a century.
- Dean Burch was forced to resign as Chairman of the Republican National Committee after being blamed for the disastrous Republican Party losses in the 1964 presidential election and the congressional elections. He was replaced by Ray C. Bliss.
- Flight tests of the "zero-gravity mock-up" of the Gemini spacecraft began. The replica of the interior of the Gemini capsule was installed in a KC-135 aircraft to allow astronauts to practice extravehicular activities under weightless conditions. John W. Young and Gus Grissom of Gemini 3 were the first to participate in the weightless simulation exercises, followed the next day by Gemini 4's James McDivitt and Ed White.
- The ejection seat system for escape from the Gemini spacecraft was tested for the first time at supersonic speed. It was successfully fired from an F-106 at Mach 1.72 at an altitude of 12,192 meters (40,000 ft), after a test earlier in the day at Mach 0.65 at 4,785 meters (15,700 ft).
- Born:
  - Rob Zombie, (stage name for as Robert B. Cummings) American heavy metal musician and filmmaker; in Haverhill, Massachusetts
  - DJ Hurricane (stage name for Wendell T. Fite), American record producer; in Dallas
  - Nikolai Borschevsky, Soviet ice hockey star who later played in the NHL; in Tomsk
- Died: Lorraine Hansberry, 34, African-American playwright best known for the Broadway play A Raisin in the Sun, died from pancreatic cancer.

== January 13, 1965 (Wednesday) ==
- Japan's Prime Minister Eisaku Satō met with U.S. Secretary of Defense Robert S. McNamara in Washington to discuss the ramifications of China's first successful test of an atomic bomb. Almost forty-four years later, in 2008, the Japanese Foreign Ministry would declassify its documents from the talk, and reveal that Sato said that Japan had no plans to develop its own nuclear weapons, but that it would "of course be a different matter in the event of a war" with China. In the event of a Chinese attack, Sato said, he expected the United States "to retaliate immediately using nuclear weapons" and that Japan would allow the U.S. to place submarines near Japan in order for missiles to be launched.
- Wilt Chamberlain, the highest-paid player in the National Basketball Association, was traded from the San Francisco Warriors to the Philadelphia 76ers shortly after he had scored 20 points for the West in the 1965 NBA All-Star Game in St Louis, a 124–123 loss to the Eastern Conference stars. Reluctantly, Chamberlain returned to Philadelphia (where he had starred for the Philadelphia Warriors before their move) and on January 21, played his first game for the 76ers, and led them to a 111–102 win over his former teammates. With Chamberlain, the 76ers, who would finish 40–40 in 1965, were 55–25 in 1966 and would win the NBA championship in 1967.
- President Johnson announced plans for a reform on U.S. immigration law, denouncing the quotas for different nationalities as "incompatible with our basic American tradition" and proposed what would become the Immigration and Nationality Act of 1965. "We have no right to disparage the ancestors of millions of our fellow Americans this way", Johnson told Congress. The legislation would pass 326–69 in the House and 76–18 in the Senate, and would be signed into law on October 3, 1965, in a ceremony staged at the Statue of Liberty.
- The Outlaws Is Coming!, the last motion picture made by the comedy trio The Three Stooges, premiered at the Texas Theater in San Antonio, Texas, a day before being released nationwide. By then, Moe Howard and Larry Fine were over 60 years old, and "Curly Joe" DeRita (who had become the third stooge after the death of Curly Howard) was in his late 50s. The film was moderately successful.

== January 14, 1965 (Thursday) ==
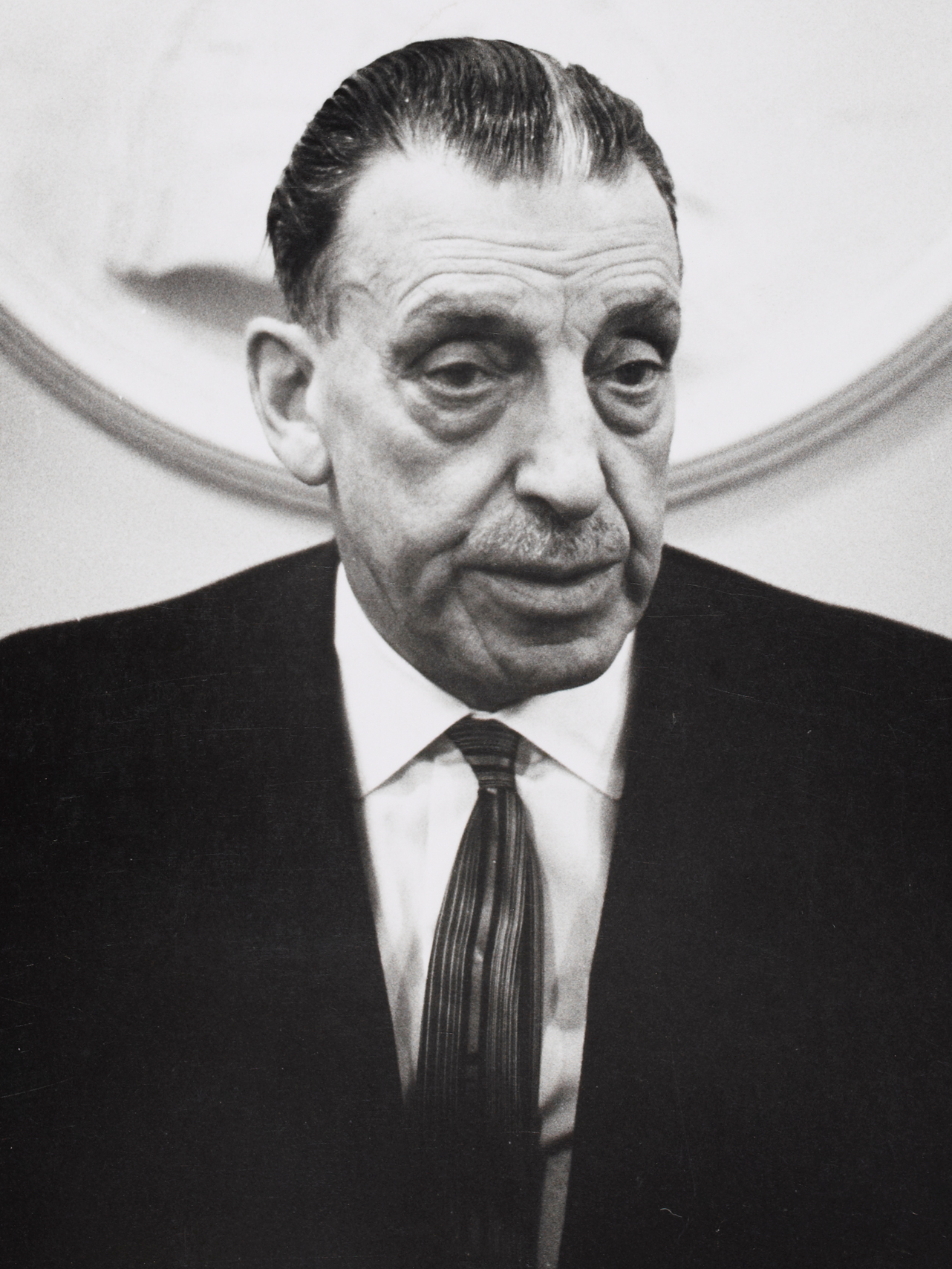
Taoiseach Lemass

- The heads of government of Northern Ireland and the Republic of Ireland met for the first time since Ireland had become a separate nation, as Irish Prime Minister (Taoiseach) Seán Lemass visited Captain Terence O'Neill, the UK's Prime Minister of Northern Ireland, at Stormont Castle in Belfast. Announcement of the meeting was made after Lemass had returned to Dublin. Escorted by unmarked police cars, Lemass had traveled across the border in an unadorned limousine on the 110-mile (180 km) trip between Dublin and Belfast. On February 9, O'Neill would visit Lemass in Dublin.
- Officials at the London Museum announced that the remains of Anne de Mowbray had been discovered, 462 years after her casket had been reburied and then lost. On January 15, 1478, at the age of five, she was united in marriage with the four-year-old Prince Richard, Duke of York. When his older brother became King Edward V of England five years later, their uncle imprisoned the three children in the Tower of London.
- NASA's Office of Manned Space Flight completed its recommendations for reducing the interval between Project Gemini flights from three to two months. The task force concluded that an accelerated launch schedule could be fully achieved by Gemini 6 and presented its findings to the office of Manned Space Flight on January 19, when the uncrewed Gemini 2 mission was launched.
- Born: Slick Rick (stage name for Richard Martin Lloyd Walters), English-born American rapper and record producer; in Mitcham, London
- Died: Jeanette MacDonald, 61, American film and stage actress and opera singer, died while awaiting open-heart surgery at the Methodist Hospital in Houston.

== January 15, 1965 (Friday) ==
- President Johnson telephoned Martin Luther King Jr., on King's 36th birthday to convey greetings. King then congratulated Johnson on the President's recent State of the Union address, and raised a proposal "to have a Negro in the Cabinet", commenting that "We feel that this would really be a great step forward for the nation, for the Negro, for our international image, and do so much to give many people a lift who need a lift now, and I'm sure it could give a new sense of dignity and self-respect to millions of Negroes who—millions of Negro youth who feel that they don't have anything to look forward to in life." Later in the year, Johnson would nominate Robert C. Weaver to become the first United States Secretary of Housing and Urban Development, and the first ever African-American Cabinet Secretary.
- The first showing of The Sound of Music, starring Julie Andrews and Christopher Plummer in 20th Century Fox's film adaptation of the Rodgers & Hammerstein musical, was made in a "sneak preview" at the Mann Theatre in Minneapolis, Minnesota, with director Robert Wise in attendance. Preview cards from the audience showed 223 "excellent" votes, three "good" votes, and none for any lower category. Another showing was made at the Brook Theatre in Tulsa, Oklahoma, the next day. Prior to the premiere (and subsequent regular showings) on March 2 at the Rivoli Theater in New York City, "three brief sequences" were removed.
- Pierre Ngendandumwe, a Hutu politician who had returned to office as the Prime Minister of Burundi only eight days earlier, was shot and killed by Tutsi extremists as he walked out of a hospital in the capital, Bujumbura, where his wife had just given birth to a baby. The man whom Ngendandumwe had replaced as premier, Tutsi politician Albin Nyamoya, was arrested for suspicion of involvement, but would be released in March. Joseph Bamina (who would be killed before the end of the year) was sworn in as the new Prime Minister on January 25 after Pié Masumbuko briefly served as the acting premier.
- The Soviet Union carried out its first "peaceful nuclear explosion" with the excavation detonation of a nuclear bomb in advance of construction as it began its "Program 7", "Peaceful Nuclear Explosions for the National Economy". The result was a crater that would become "Lake Chagan" in the Kazakh SSR from the damming of the Chagan River. The body of water is colloquially referred to as the "Atomic Lake" because it remains radioactive.
- Born:
  - Bernard Hopkins, American professional boxer who held the world middleweight championship (between 1995 and 2005) and world light heavyweight championship (between 2011 and 2014) for different circuits (WBA, WBC, IBF, IBO); in Philadelphia
  - Michael "Pinball" Clemons, American athlete who became the Canadian Football League's Most Outstanding Player (for the Toronto Argonauts) and later guided the Argonauts to the CFL championship as their head coach; in Dunedin, Florida
  - Adam Jones, American guitarist for Tool; in Park Ridge

== January 16, 1965 (Saturday) ==
- At 9:31 in the morning, 22 residents of a neighborhood in Wichita, Kansas, were killed when a U.S. Air Force KC-135 jet tanker crashed on North Piatt Street near 20th Street, and enveloped 11 houses in flame. All seven of the crew died in the accident. Loaded with almost 31,000 US gallons (120,000 L; 26,000 imp gal) of jet fuel, the KC-135 had taken off from McConnell Air Force Base on a training exercise to refuel a B-52 in flight. The site where the homes once stood is now Piatt Park.
- Canadian Prime Minister Lester B. Pearson and U.S. President Lyndon B. Johnson signed the Canada-United States Automotive Agreement, eliminating tariffs for auto industry manufacturers, at the LBJ Ranch in Texas. The agreement would be approved by Canada two days later by an order in council, and by the United States Senate in October (and made retroactive to January).
- Nine people were killed and 50 injured at a train station at Bonassola, Italy, near Genoa, when a freight car with 1,200 pounds (540 kg) of dynamite exploded. Five of the dead and most of the injured had been passengers on a train that had stopped at the station shortly before the blast.
- British part-time soldier Brian Spillett entered a neighbour's house to try to save him from a fire. He failed, and both men died. Spillett would be posthumously awarded the George Cross for his bravery.
- U.S. Marshals arrested 18 men in Philadelphia, Mississippi, including the sheriff and deputy sheriff of Neshoba County, in the case surrounding the 1964 murders of Chaney, Goodman, and Schwerner.

== January 17, 1965 (Sunday) ==
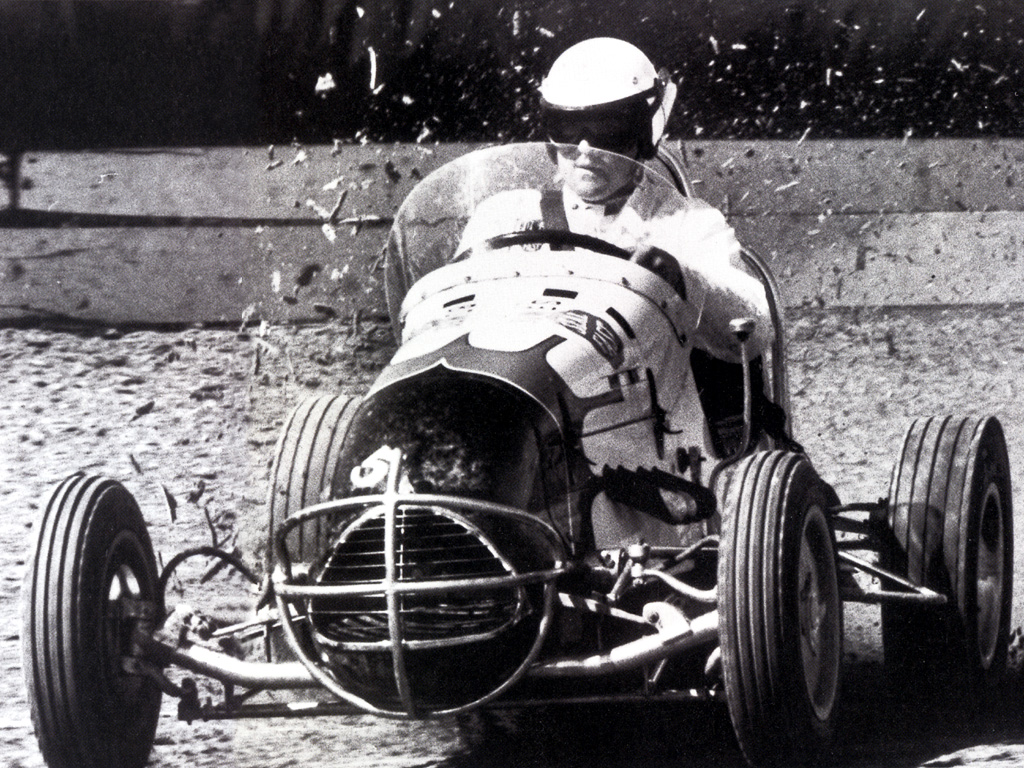
Rumors of Foyt's death greatly exaggerated

- Auto racing legend A. J. Foyt, who had twice won the Indianapolis 500 and was the defending U.S. Auto Club National Champion, was pronounced dead at the scene of a crash at the Motor Trend 500 race in Riverside, California. Foyt's car had flipped several times after his brakes went out and his back was broken, but the judgment by one of the doctors on the scene turned out to be premature. After recovering from surgery, Foyt would resume racing and win two more Indy 500s, the Daytona 500, and the 24 Hours of Le Mans race. Fifty years later, Foyt would celebrate his 80th birthday.
- Born: Manolo (Manuel Sánchez Delgado), Spanish footballer for Atlético Madrid, with 28 caps for Spain national team; in Cáceres

== January 18, 1965 (Monday) ==
- The Kawnpui Convention concluded after three days of meetings between over 100 leaders of the Sino-Tibetan Kukir minority in northeast India, from the Paite National Council, the Vaiphei National Organisation, the Simte National Organisation, the Chin National Union, the Mizo National Union, the Hmar National Union, the Kuki National Assembly, the Gangte Tribal Union, the Kom National Union and the Biete Convention Council. Meeting under the leadership of General Secretary Holkhomang Haokip, and Chairman K. T. Lalla, at Kawnpui in Churachandpur district of the Manipur state, the diverse group agreed on a common cause of petitioning for a separate state within India. Seven years later, Mizoram would be separated from the state of Assam. On February 20, 1987, Mizoram would become the 23rd State of India.
- Eli Cohen, a spy for Israel's Mossad intelligence agency, was arrested in Damascus after more than two years of transmitting Syria's military secrets to his Israeli handlers. Posing as Kamal Amin Ta'abat, he had successfully posed as a wealthy Syrian Muslim who returned home after making his fortune in Argentina, where he had established friendships with Syrian government officials. Ta'abat/Cohen's downfall came when Colonel Ahmed Su'edani became chief of Syrian intelligence, and traced the origin of daily Morse code transmissions to the Mossad agent's apartment. Even under torture, Cohen would betray no relevant information about Israeli intelligence, and he would be hanged on May 18, 1965, in a televised ceremony.
- The Soviet Union claimed that the United States and West Germany were planning to build "an 800-mile curtain belt of atomic land mines" across the border between West Germany and the nations of East Germany and Czechoslovakia. The United States responded that there had never been any plans for "atomic land mines".
- At Kooyong Stadium, the Australian women's tennis team won their second straight Federation Cup. Although the U.S. team had beaten the Australians in the doubles event, it had already been mathematically eliminated after Billie Jean King lost to Margaret Smith Court in two sets.
- Born: Dave Attell, American comedian, actor and writer, in Queens, New York City

== January 19, 1965 (Tuesday) ==
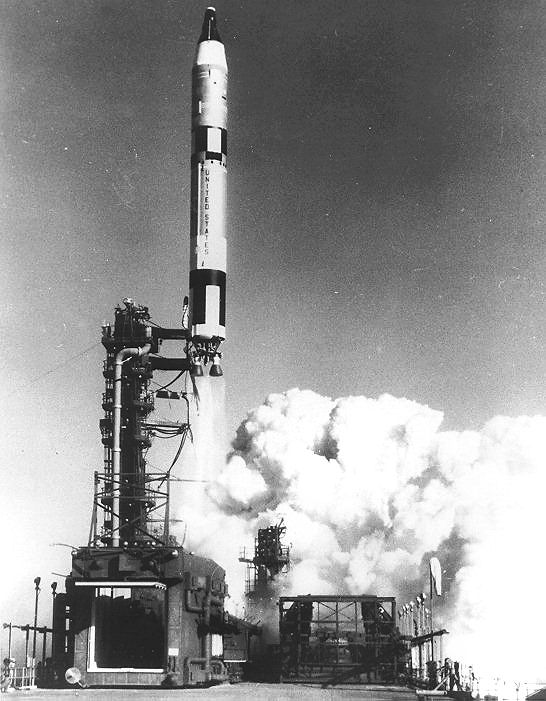
January 19, 1965: Launch of Gemini 2

- Gemini 2, an uncrewed suborbital flight, was successfully launched from complex 19 at Cape Kennedy at 9:04 a.m. EST. The primary objective was to demonstrate the adequacy of the spacecraft reentry module's heat shields to protect the capsule's occupants during a maximum-heating-rate reentry, as well as to assess the structural integrity of the spacecraft from liftoff through reentry and the satisfactory performance of spacecraft systems before sending two astronauts into space. Gemini 2 reached a maximum altitude of 92.4 nautical miles (171.1 km; 106.3 mi). Retrorockets fired 6 minutes 54 seconds after launch, and the spacecraft landed in the Atlantic Ocean 11 minutes 22 seconds later, 1,848 nautical miles (3,422 km; 2,127 mi) southeast of the launch site. Full duration of the mission was 18 minutes 16 seconds. The primary recovery ship, the aircraft carrier USS Lake Champlain, picked up the spacecraft at 10:52 a.m. EST.
- The U.S. Air Force Academy announced that it was investigating whether some of its cadets had cheated on recent examinations, or failed to report (pursuant to the Academy's Cadet Honor Code) their awareness that other cadets had cheated. Ultimately, 109 cadets would resign.

== January 20, 1965 (Wednesday) ==
- Lyndon B. Johnson was inaugurated for his own full term as President of the United States. Hubert H. Humphrey was given the oath as the U.S. Vice-President, which had been vacant since Johnson had been sworn in on November 22, 1963. Johnson's inaugural address was only 1,259 words long, and was completed in 22 minutes, including 11 interruptions for applause. "Applause was discouraged by his sober delivery", reporter Walter Trohan of the Chicago Tribune wrote the next day. Johnson used the term that would define his domestic policy when he said, "In a land of great wealth, families must not live in hopeless poverty. In a land rich in harvest, children just must not go hungry. In a land of healing miracles, neighbors must not suffer and die untended. In a great land of learning and scholars, young people must be taught to read and write.... I do not believe that the Great Society is the ordered, changeless, and sterile battalion of the ants. It is the excitement of becoming-always becoming, trying, probing, falling, resting, and trying again--but always trying and always gaining." He also alluded to the war in Vietnam that would ultimately prove the undoing of his foreign policy, saying "If American lives must end, and American treasure be spilled, in countries that we barely know, then that is the price that change has demanded of conviction and of our enduring covenant."
- In the October 1961 issue of Popular Mechanics, meteorologist Irving P. Krick, who claimed that he could forecast specific weather even years in advance, had predicted that "The weather in Washington, D.C., on January 20, 1965, will be fair with unseasonably high temperatures. Highest temperature of the day will be in the 50s." Krick was not far off; the high in Washington that day was 46 degrees and the weather was partly cloudy.
- The White House had sent out inaugural invitations to more than 200,000 households, an unprecedented number, but there was a catch. The vast majority of those were labeled "souvenir invitation" and had a disclaimer that said "the invitation in itself does not constitute an admission to any of the inaugural events". As one cynic noted, "the souvenir invitation just admits you to the city of Washington".
- Indonesia confirmed its decision to become the first member to withdraw from the United Nations, as Foreign Minister Subandrio gave formal notification to Secretary-General U Thant. Indonesia would return to the UN twenty months later, on September 19, 1966.
- Born: Sophie, Duchess of Edinburgh, wife of Prince Edward, Duke of Edinburgh; as Sophie Rhys-Jones in Oxford
- Died: Alan Freed, 43, pioneering American radio disc jockey who popularized rock and roll music, died five days after being admitted into a hospital from uremia and cirrhosis brought on by alcoholism. A biographer would later note, "He went to the grave penniless— a far cry from just a few years before, when he had been able to claim thousands of dollars a day for his services."

== January 21, 1965 (Thursday) ==
- In the by-election in the London suburb of Leyton, Ronald Buxton of the Conservative Party narrowly defeated the Labour Party's Patrick Gordon Walker, Prime Minister Harold Wilson's choice for Secretary of State for Foreign Affairs. It was the second failure for Walker, who had also been beaten in an October by-election in the Birmingham suburb of Smethwick. Buxton won by only 205 votes (16,544 to 16,339), but the victory reduced the Labour Party's majority in the House of Commons to only three seats, with only 318 of the 630 member body.
- Hassan Ali Mansur, the 41-year-old Prime Minister of Iran, was shot and fatally wounded as he stepped out of his limousine and prepared to walk into the parliament building in Tehran. Mohammed Bokhara'i, a 19-year-old student, fired five shots and struck Mansur twice, wounding him in the abdomen and in the neck. Bokhara'i was a member of the Islamic radical group Fada'iyan-e Islam, a group affiliated with Muslim clerics close to the exiled Ayatollah Khomeini.
- Born: Jam Master Jay (stage name for Jason Mizell), American rap DJ with Run-D.M.C.; in New York City (murdered, 2002)
- Died: Dixie Bibb Graves, 82, American politician who served as United States Senator for Alabama from August 1937 to January 1938 at the same time that she was the First Lady of Alabama for her husband, incumbent Governor Bibb Graves.

== January 22, 1965 (Friday) ==
- TIROS-9, the first weather satellite that could provide pictures of the entire Earth, was launched into a nearly polar orbit that took it around the Earth 12 times per day. Spinning on its side, it effectively rolled in its orbit and, with a camera on each side, could face perpendicularly to the Earth twice during each roll. With wide-angle views, the TIROS-9 could pass over every section of the globe twice a day, during daytime and at night. The real-time information would first prove to be lifesaving in December 1966, when meteorologists would be able to warn residents of the Fiji Islands of a rapidly approaching hurricane in time for them to evacuate.
- Michael Stewart was appointed as the new Foreign Secretary of the United Kingdom by Prime Minister Harold Wilson. Stewart replaced Patrick Gordon Walker, who was asked to resign after his second defeat in a by-election the day before.
- Born:
  - DJ Jazzy Jeff (stage name for Jeffrey Allen Townes), American rapper and actor; in Philadelphia
  - Diane Lane, American film actress; in New York City

== January 23, 1965 (Saturday) ==
- The supercarrier USS America was commissioned at the Norfolk Naval Shipyard, and placed under the command of Captain Lawrence Heyworth Jr. One of the three Kitty Hawk-class aircraft carriers, America had a total length of 1,048 feet (319 m) and a width of 248 feet (76 m), and room for almost 5,200 officers and sailors. Forty years later, it would be scuttled on May 14, 2005, after being retired and put through live weapons testing, and would become the largest warship in history to be sunk.
- Defense Secretary Robert S. McNamara announced that the U.S. Department of Defense was requesting proposals from the aerospace industry for design studies to support development of the Manned Orbiting Laboratory (MOL) (especially cost and technical data). Three contractors would be chosen to conduct the studies, a step preliminary to any DOD decision to proceed with full-scale development of the space laboratory.
- Rioters in the city of Huế burned down the U.S. Information Agency, and a teenage girl set fire to herself in protest, after South Vietnam's Prime Minister Trần Văn Hương issued a decree to increase the number of young men who would be drafted into the Army of the Republic of Vietnam (ARVN) to fight against the Viet Cong. After the rioting continued nationwide for ten days, the ARVN's generals replaced him.
- Sir Edric Bastyan, Governor of South Australia, officially opened Kensington's Olympic sports arena.
- Born: Michael Schade, Swiss-born Canadian operatic tenor; in Geneva

== January 24, 1965 (Sunday) ==
- Sir Winston Churchill, the former Prime Minister of the United Kingdom who had guided Britain through World War II and later through the economic problems of the 1950s, died at the age of 90, two weeks after suffering a severe stroke. His final words, reportedly, were "I'm so bored with it all." Sir John Colville, Churchill's private secretary, would recall that 12 years earlier, in 1953, Churchill had said, "Today is the 24th of January. It's the day my father died. It's the day I shall die too." Lord Randolph Churchill had died on January 24, 1895, exactly 70 years before his famous son.
- The Liberian cargo ship SS San Nicola sank in the Pacific 750 nautical miles (1,390 km) north west of Honolulu, Hawaii. All 30 crew were rescued by Maria and taken to Japan.
- Eli Cohen, an agent for Israel's Mossad spy agency, was captured in Syria at his apartment in Damascus. He would be hanged after a conviction for espionage.
- Born: Mike Awesome (ring name for Michael Lee Alfonso), American professional wrestler who also appeared in Japanese pro wrestling as "The Gladiator"; in Tampa (committed suicide, 2007)

== January 25, 1965 (Monday) ==
- At a meeting of the Chinese Communist Party's Politburo, Party Chairman Mao Zedong and Chinese President Liu Shaoqi had what proved to be a fateful confrontation over Mao's proposals for an overthrow of the party's bureaucracy. It was then, Mao would tell interviewer Edgar Snow years later, that he decided that Liu "had to go".
- The death of former British Prime Minister Winston Churchill was mourned worldwide. In the United States, President Johnson ordered that all U.S. flags be flown at half-staff on federal buildings, naval vessels, and American embassies, bases and government installations worldwide.
- The British liner RMS Queen Elizabeth 2 ran aground off Cherbourg, France, but was refloated undamaged shortly afterwards.
- Joseph Bamina became the new Prime Minister of Burundi, ten days after the assassination of Pierre Ngendandumwe.
- Civil rights activist Annie Lee Cooper punched Dallas County, Alabama, Sheriff Jim Clark in the face.
- Malta became the 18th nation to join the Council of Europe.
- Pope Paul VI appointed 27 new cardinals.
- Born: Esa Tikkanen, Finnish ice hockey player, NHL star and member of Finland national team; in Helsinki
- Shai Piron , Israeli politician and Rabbi which was the Ministry of education between 2013 to 2014
- Died: Sumner Sewall, 67, American World War I flying ace who later served as Governor of Maine from 1941 to 1945

== January 26, 1965 (Tuesday) ==
- Pursuant to Article 313 of the Indian Constitution, Hindi replaced English as the official language of India on Republic Day, with English to be used only for limited purposes. On the same day that Hindi-speakers were celebrating, however, Dravida Munnetra Kazhagam (DMK), a political party whose members were primarily speakers of the Tamil language, declared the event a day of mourning and called for protests that led to riots and suicides. Other minority groups in south India would join in the protest, particularly students who had grown up speaking their own language and English. "Northerners and Southerners start from the same point in English", one observer would note, but those who had not grown up speaking Hindi would be at a disadvantage in their careers. On February 11, Prime Minister Shastri would announce that the Hindi-only plans would be halted until further notice.
- Stephen Ailes, the United States Secretary of the Army, came under fire from both Democrats and Republicans in the U.S. Senate's appropriations subcommittee when he sought budgetary approval for a proposal that was quickly derided as the "Instant Veteran Program". As the Senators described the Ailes plan, up to "8,000 young men incapable of meeting the minimum physical and mental requirements for military service" would be inducted into the U.S. Army anyway, and "could serve one day and then be discharged as a veteran, eligible for veterans' benefits available to service men who had completed long periods in uniform." Ailes noted that the plan (which the subcommittee declined to endorse) would cost $31,300,000 in its first year in 1965 dollars, the equivalent of $235 million fifty years later.
- Waneta Hoyt committed the first of five murders of her infant children, as three-month-old Eric Hoyt was found dead of what appeared to be sudden infant death syndrome. Not until 1994, after the deaths of her four other infant children between 1968 and 1971, would Hoyt confess to the homicides. She would be sentenced to 75 years in prison in 1996 and pass away less than two years later.
- President Humberto de Alencar Castelo Branco of Brazil decided that the Brazilian Air Force henceforth would control all Brazilian fixed-wing military aircraft, including those aboard the aircraft carrier Minas Gerais, and that the Brazilian Navy would control all seagoing rotary-wing aircraft. Key Brazilian naval personnel resigned in protest.
- Britain's Royal Air Force permanently retired all of the Vickers Valiant jet bombers in its fleet from further service. An aluminium alloy used in the aircraft's construction, "DTD683", proved to be prone to premature metal fatigue, leading to accidents, and parts had to be frequently replaced.
- The European Economic Community adopted Directive 65/65/EEC as a directive that "aimed to establish and maintain a high level of protection for public health" by requiring prior approval by the EEC for the marketing of pharmaceuticals originating within the EEC member nations.
- The fossil of the skull of Zinjanthropus (Paranthropus boisei) was presented to the National Museum of Tanzania by the people who had discovered it on July 17, 1959, Mary Leakey and Louis Leakey, who turned it over to Tanzanian President Julius Nyerere at a ceremony in Dar es Salaam.
- Born:
  - Natalia Yurchenko, Soviet gymnast, inductee to the International Gymnastics Hall of Fame, 1982 and 1983 overall women's world champion for whom the "Yurchenko vaults" gymnastic move is named; in Norilsk, Russian SFSR, Soviet Union
  - Kevin McCarthy, American politician, Speaker of the House of Representatives from January to October 2023, House Minority Leader from 2019 to 2023; in Bakersfield, California
- Died:
  - Hassan Ali Mansur, 41, Prime Minister of Iran, died from gunshot wounds he had received five days earlier. Amir-Abbas Hoveyda was named the following day to succeed Mansur.
  - Elwood "Bingo" DeMoss, 75, African-American baseball player and manager in baseball's Negro leagues

== January 27, 1965 (Wednesday) ==
- U.S. National Security Advisor McGeorge Bundy and Secretary of Defense Robert S. McNamara presented to President Johnson their report, "Re: Basic Policy in Vietnam". In what would become known as the "'Fork in the Road' memorandum", Bundy and McNamara recommended him to escalate the Vietnam War rather than to pursue a peaceful resolution. "What we want to say to you", Bundy wrote, "is that both of us are now pretty well convinced that our current policy can lead only to disastrous defeat... Bob and I are persuaded that there is no real hope of success in this area unless and until our own policy and priorities change." The "two alternatives" that they envisioned were presented as assertiveness or timidity: "The first is to use our military power in the Far East and to force a change of Communist policy", while the other was "to deploy all our resources along a track of negotiation, aimed at salvaging what little can be preserved". Of those choices, "Bob and I tend to favor the first course", Bundy wrote, "but we believe that both should be carefully studied and that alternative programs should be argued out before you." He closed by noting 'McNamara and I have reached the point where our obligations to you simply do not permit us to administer our present directives in silence and let you think we see real hope in them." Johnson would choose the first alternative, and by the end of the year, more than 200,000 American troops would be in South Vietnam.
- The National Science Foundation announced that it had selected a site 100 miles (160 km) northeast of the Hawaiian island of Maui as the site for Project Mohole, an attempt to dig the world's deepest hole, in order to penetrate the Earth's crust and into the Earth's mantle. The word "mohole" was derived from the Mohorovicic discontinuity, a band of matter discovered by Yugoslavian seismologist Andrija Mohorovičić and lying between the crust and the mantle.
- South Vietnam's Lieutenant General Nguyễn Khánh led a coup d'état and removed the civilian government led by Prime Minister Trần Văn Hương. The next day, Khanh appointed Nguyễn Xuân Oánh, who had once been a professor of economics at Trinity College in Connecticut, as the new premier.
- Austen Albu was appointed Minister of State for Economic Affairs in the UK government by Prime Minister Harold Wilson.
- Born:
  - Alan Cumming, Scottish stage, film and television actor who won a Tony Award for best actor for his performance in Cabaret in 1998; in Aberfeldy, Perth and Kinross
  - Ignacio Noé, Argentine comic book artist and children's book illustrator; in Belén de Escobar
- Died: C. Douglass Buck, 74, former Governor of Delaware and U.S. Senator

== January 28, 1965 (Thursday) ==
- The government of Syria announced that it had been decreed the right to dismiss and appoint religious leaders, effectively giving itself control over the messages being delivered by Muslim and Christian clerics to its citizens.
- Queen Elizabeth II proclaimed the new Canadian flag, three months after the design by Jacques Saint-Cyr had been approved by Prime Minister Pearson. A filibuster by the Tory Party had delayed approval by Parliament.
- According to a 1967 internal memo of the Communist Viet Cong, a gas attack by the United States on the village of Phu Lac in the Phú Yên Province killed 100 civilians.
- Died:
  - Maxime Weygand, 98, French Army general and former High Commissioner for Syria. On November 11, 1918, as chief of staff to Marshal Ferdinand Foch, Weygand had read the terms of the German surrender to representatives of the German Army and Navy inside a railway car at Compiègne. On June 22, 1940, General Weygand signed the French surrender to Nazi Germany at the same site.
  - Alfred P. "Tich" Freeman, 76, English cricket player who remains the only man to take 300 wickets in an English season.

== January 29, 1965 (Friday) ==
- The U.S. Army Special Forces made an unsuccessful attempt to rescue Captain Nick Rowe, a Special Forces adviser who had been taken as a prisoner of war in South Vietnam on October 29, 1963. The plan called for American helicopters to descend upon the POW camp where he had been sighted, and to flood it with tear gas, then for an ambulance helicopter to land in the camp and rescue any Americans there. Unfortunately, Rowe had been moved a month earlier, and the rescuers found an empty camp. Rowe would finally escape his captors on December 31, 1968.
- Police in Kuala Lumpur arrested Burhanuddin al-Helmy, the leader of Malaysia's Pan-Malaysian Islamic Party; Aziz Ishak, a former Agricultural Minister and founder of the National Convention Party; and Ishak Haji Muhammad, the Chairman of the Labour Party of Malaya and of the Malayan Peoples' Socialist Front. All three were accused of attempting to establish a pro-Indonesian government-in-exile and planning to supersede the existing government.
- Qualification testing of the food, water, and waste management systems for the Gemini-Titan 3 mission was completed.
- Hakametsä, the first ice hockey arena of Finland, is founded in Tampere.
- Born: Dominik Hašek, Czech-born ice hockey goaltender who played 16 seasons in the NHL and is enshrined in the Hockey Hall of Fame; in Pardubice, Czechoslovakia
- Died: Jack Hylton, 72, English dance band leader

== January 30, 1965 (Saturday) ==
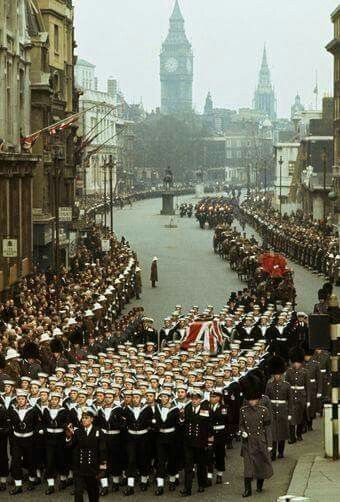
January 30, 1965: Funeral procession of Winston Churchill

- The state funeral of Sir Winston Churchill took place with the largest assembly of statesmen in the world until the 2005 funeral of Pope John Paul II. Guests from 110 of the world's nations included "five presidents, plus one former president; four kings, two queens, [and] 11 prime ministers". The ceremony was televised worldwide, with an estimated audience of 350,000,000 people watching (including 45,000,000 in the United States, where NBC, CBS and ABC televised it), and one million gathered on the streets of London to watch the funeral procession, which included 7,000 marching soldiers and nine military bands. Churchill's casket was then transported from St. Paul's Cathedral in London to his birthplace, the village of Bladon, where he was buried at the St. Martin's Church graveyard.
- Israel permitted American inspectors to make a ten-hour tour of its Negev nuclear research facility near Dimona. Though the Americans were "not given as comprehensive and intensive a tour as they wanted, they came to the conclusion that it was sufficient to allow them to determine the nature of the Dimona reactor", and that Israel had no intention of developing nuclear capability, although its production capacity was at a high enough level to make it possible in the future. The New York Times would reveal the details two months later, on March 14.
- In one of the most famous high school basketball games in history, the 71-game winning streak of the Power Memorial Academy Panthers (from New York City) was brought to an end in a 46–43 upset by the DeMatha Catholic High School Stags (from Hyattsville, Maryland, a suburb of Washington, D.C.) at a game played in College Park, Maryland. The Panthers' Lew Alcindor (who would change his name to Kareem Abdul-Jabbar) was held to only 16 points, less than half of his average.
- The Ministry of Culture of the People's Republic of China and its Language Reform Committee issued The Table of the Typeface of the Currently Used Chinese Characters, setting the 6,196 Chinese characters that would be used in printed documents. Two days earlier, the Department of State Affairs had issued The Plan for Chinese Character Simplification to outline the 569 simplified Chinese characters.
- Died: Frol Kozlov, 56, former deputy prime minister of the Soviet Union who had once been viewed as a likely successor to Communist Party First Secretary Nikita Khrushchev, died from heart failure three months after being removed from office following Khrushchev's ouster.

== January 31, 1965 (Sunday) ==
- In Guadalajara in Mexico, 25 people, many of them children, were killed when members of a crowd panicked at an entrance to a stage show. There were 50,000 available seats at the El Progresso stadium, and the people who were trampled had been caught when the crowd leaving the first show encountered another crowd trying to get into the second one.
