= Sedan (nuclear test) =

1962 underground nuclear test at the Nevada Test Site

Storax Sedan
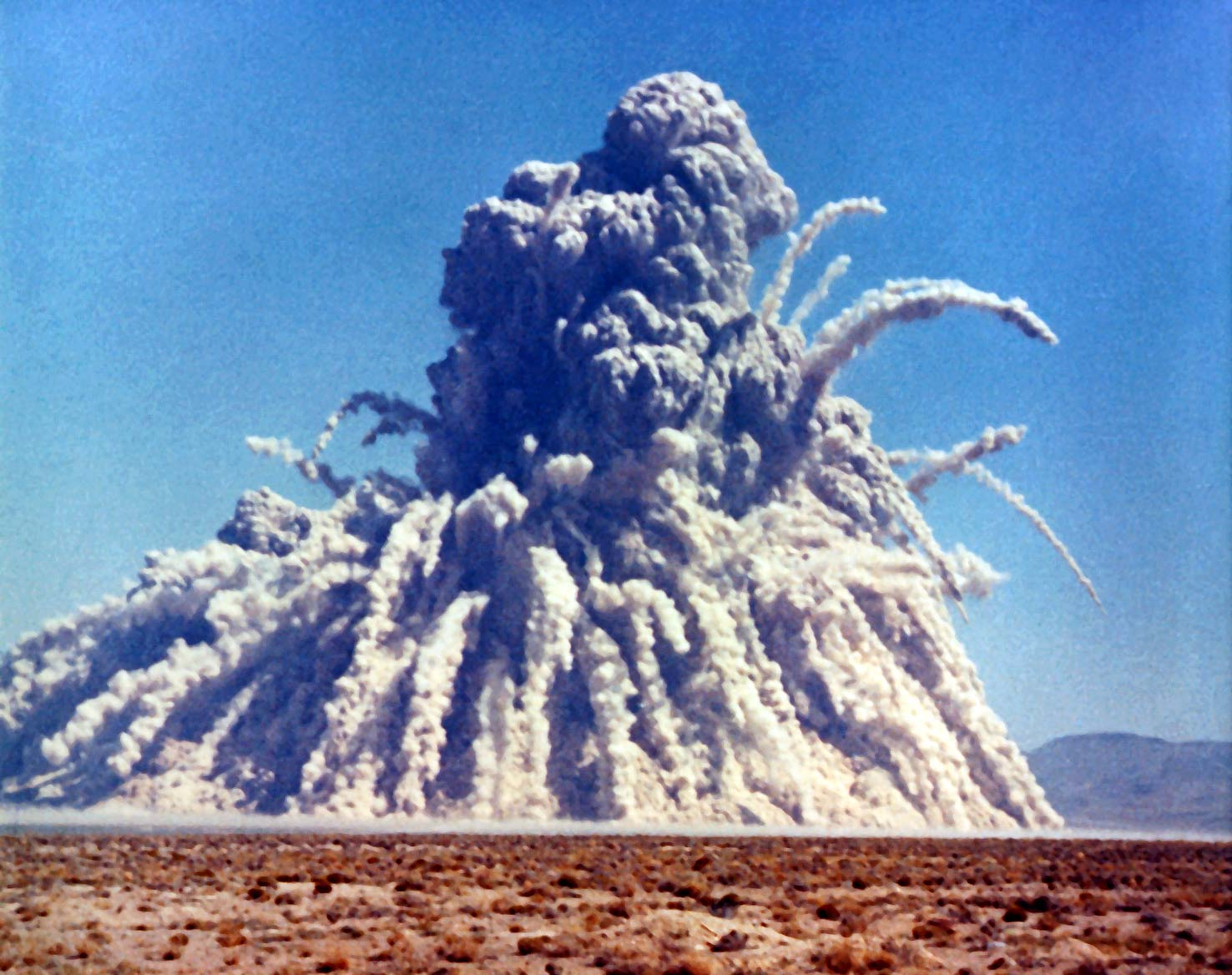
- Storax Sedan explosion

Information
- Country: United States
- Test series: Operation Storax; Operation Plowshare
- Test site: Nevada Test Site
- Date: July 6, 1962
- Test type: Underground
- Yield: 104 kt

- Sedan Crater
- U.S. National Register of Historic Places
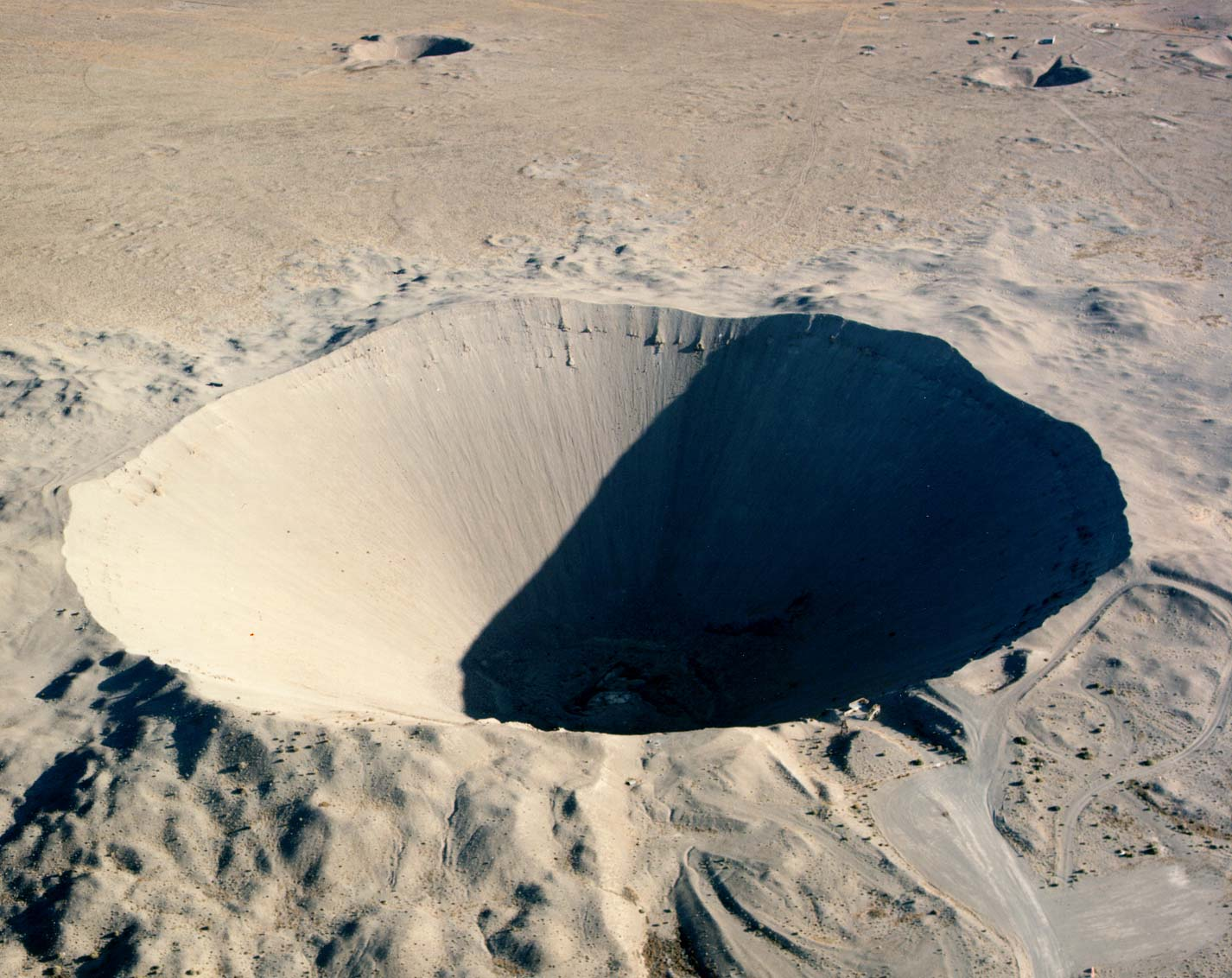
- The Sedan crater

- Location within Nevada
- Location: Area 10, Nevada Test Site
- Nearest city: Mercury, Nevada
- Coordinates: 37°10′37″N 116°02′46″W
- NRHP reference No.: 94000183
- Added to NRHP: March 21, 1994

Storax Sedan was a shallow underground nuclear test conducted in Area 10 of Yucca Flat at the Nevada National Security Site on July 6, 1962, as part of Operation Plowshare, a program to investigate the use of nuclear explosives for mining, cratering, and other civilian purposes. The radioactive fallout from the test contaminated more US residents than any other nuclear test. The Sedan Crater is the largest human-made crater in the United States and is listed on the National Register of Historic Places.

== Effects ==
Sedan was a thermonuclear device with a fission yield less than 30% and a fusion yield about 70%. According to Carey Sublette, the design of the Sedan device was similar to that used in the Bluestone and Swanee tests of Operation Dominic conducted days and months prior to Sedan respectively, and was therefore not unlike the W56 high yield Minuteman I missile warhead. The device had a diameter of 43 cm (17 in), a length of 96.5 cm (38.0 in), and a weight of 212.2 kg (468 lb).

The timing of the test put it within the Operation Storax fiscal year, but Sedan was functionally part of Operation Plowshare, and the test protocol was sponsored and conducted by Lawrence Livermore National Laboratory with minimal involvement by the United States Department of Defense. The explosive device was lowered into a shaft drilled into the desert alluvium 194 m (636 ft) deep. The fusion-fission blast had a yield equivalent to 104 kilotons of TNT (435 terajoules) and lifted a dome of earth 90 m (300 ft) above the desert floor before it vented at three seconds after detonation, exploding upward and outward displacing 12,000,000 short tons (11,000,000 t) of soil.

=== Sedan Crater ===
The resulting crater is 100 m (330 ft) deep with a diameter of about 390 m (1,280 ft). A circular area of the desert floor five miles across was obscured by fast-expanding dust clouds moving out horizontally from the base surge, akin to pyroclastic surge. The blast caused seismic waves equivalent to an earthquake of 4.75 on the Richter scale. The radiation level on the crater lip at 1 hour after the burst was 500 R per hour (130 mC/(kg·h)), but it dropped to 500 mR per hour after 27 days.

Within 7 months (~210 days) of the excavation, the bottom of the crater could be safely walked upon with no protective clothing, with radiation levels at 35 mR per hour after 167 days.

Over 10,000 people per year visit the crater through free monthly tours offered by the U.S. Department of Energy, National Nuclear Security Administration Nevada Site Office. The crater was listed on the National Register of Historic Places on March 21, 1994.

Salsola tragus, also known as tumbleweed, is the primary plant species growing in the crater along with some grasses. Analysis in 1993 observed that the original perennial shrubs once living there had shown no recovery.

==== Statistics ====
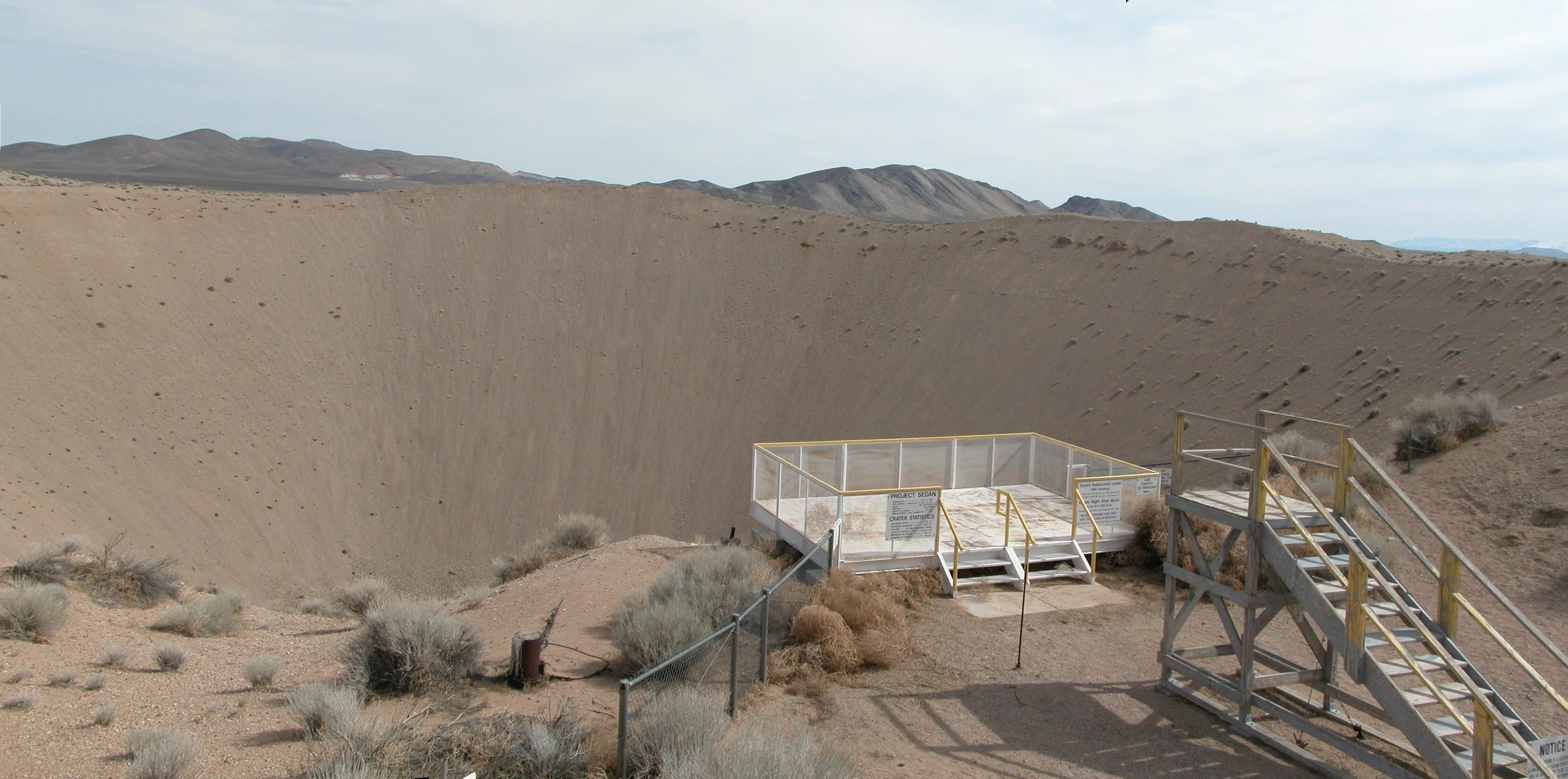
Observation decks at Sedan Crater

- Maximum depth – 320 feet (98 m)
- Maximum diameter – 1,280 feet (390 m)
- Volume – 6.6 million cubic yards (5.0×10^{6} m^{3})
- Weight of material lifted – 12 million short tons (11 Mt)
- Maximum lip height – 100 feet (30 m)
- Minimum lip height – 20 feet (6.1 m)
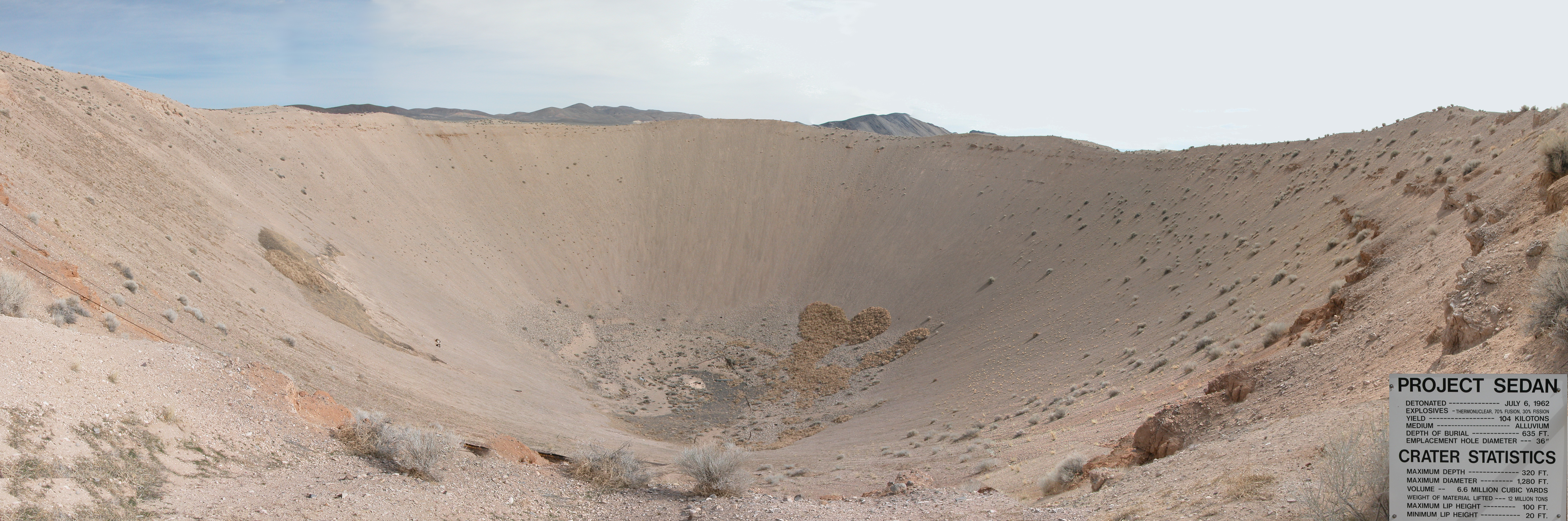
Panorama of the crater with Russian thistle tumbleweed accumulating at the bottom.

== Fallout ==
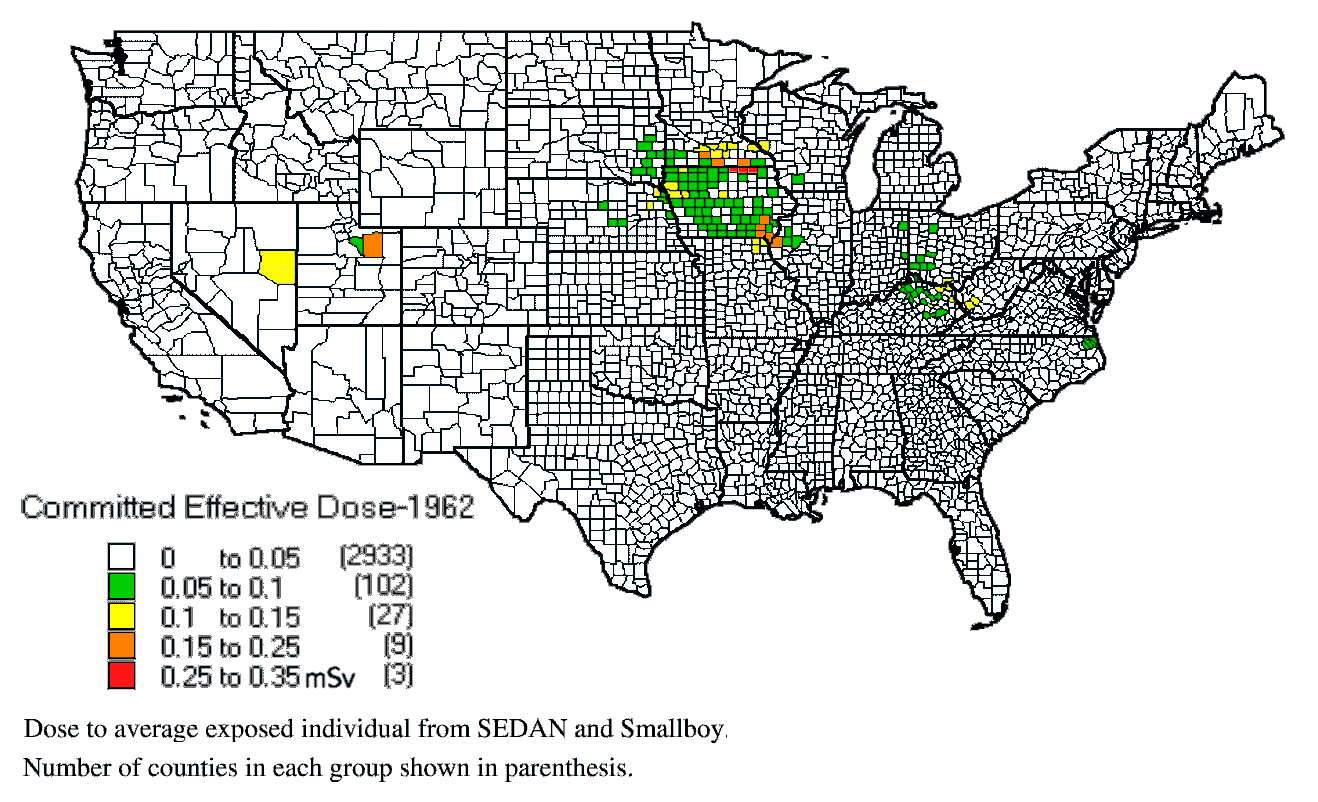
US counties that measured the highest levels of radioactive fallout from both Sedan and "Small Boy" of Operation Sunbeam, detonated eight days later. Units are millisieverts.

The ten highest radiation exposures to residents from US continental nuclear testing

The explosion caused two plumes of radioactive cloud, rising to 3.0 km and 4.9 km (10,000 ft and 16,000 ft). The plumes headed northeast and then east in roughly parallel paths towards the Atlantic Ocean. Nuclear fallout was dropped through several counties. Detected radioactivity was especially high in eight counties in Iowa and one county each in Nebraska, South Dakota and Illinois. The most heavily affected counties were Howard, Mitchell and Worth counties in Iowa as well as Washabaugh County in South Dakota. The average estimated fallout from Sedan on Howard, Mitchell and Worth counties was 950 microcuries each, while Washabaugh County received an estimated average of 860 microcuries of fallout. The explosion created fallout that affected more US residents than any other nuclear test, exposing more than 13 million people to radiation.

Of all the nuclear tests conducted in the United States, Sedan ranked highest in overall activity of radionuclides in fallout. The test released 880,000 curies (33 PBq) of radioactive iodine-131, an agent of thyroid disease, into the atmosphere. Sedan ranked first in percentages of these particular radionuclides detected in fallout: ^{198}Au, ^{199}Au, ^{7}Be, ^{99}Mo, ^{147}Nd, ^{203}Pb, ^{181}W, ^{185}W and ^{188}W. Sedan ranked second in these radionuclides in fallout: ^{57}Co, ^{60}Co and ^{54}Mn. Sedan ranked third in the detected amount of ^{24}Na in fallout. In countrywide deposition of radionuclides, Sedan was highest in the amount of ^{7}Be, ^{54}Mn, ^{106}Ru and ^{242}Cm, and second highest in the amount of deposited ^{127m}Te.

Sedan's fallout contamination contributed a little under 7% to the total amount of radiation which fell on the US population during all of the nuclear tests at the Nevada Test Site. Sedan's effects were similar to shot "George" of Operation Tumbler–Snapper, detonated on June 1, 1952, which also contributed about 7% to the total radioactive fallout. Uncertainty regarding exact amounts of exposure prevents knowing which of the two nuclear tests caused the most; George is listed as being the highest exposure and Sedan second highest by the United States Department of Health and Human Services, Centers for Disease Control and Prevention, and the National Cancer Institute.

== Conclusions ==
The Plowshare project developed the Sedan test in order to determine the feasibility of using nuclear detonations to quickly and economically excavate large amounts of earth and rock. Proposed applications included the creation of harbors, canals, open pit mines, railroad and highway cuts through mountainous terrain and the construction of dams. Assessment of the full effects of the Sedan shot showed that the radioactive fallout from such uses would be extensive. Public concerns about the health effects and a lack of political support eventually led to abandonment of the concept. No such nuclear excavation has since been undertaken by the United States, though the Soviet Union continued to pursue the concept through their program Nuclear Explosions for the National Economy, particularly with their 140 kiloton Chagan (nuclear test), which created an artificial lake reservoir (see Lake Chagan).

== Diplomatic issue with Sudan ==
On March 2, 2005, Ellen Tauscher, a Democratic member of the U.S. House of Representatives from California, used Sedan as an example of a test which produced a considerable amount of radioactive fallout while giving congressional testimony on the containment of debris from nuclear testing. However, the name "Sedan" was incorrectly transcribed as "Sudan" in the Congressional Record.

Within days of the error, the international community took notice. Sudanese officials responded by stating that "the Sudanese government takes this issue seriously and with extreme importance". The Chinese Xinhua General News Service published an article claiming that the Sudanese government blamed the U.S. for raising cancer rates among the Sudanese people. Despite the U.S. embassy in Khartoum issuing a statement clarifying that it was a typographic error, Mustafa Osman Ismail, the Sudanese Foreign Minister, stated his government would continue investigating the claims.

== See also ==
- Chagan (nuclear test)
- Peaceful nuclear explosion
- Greenhouse Item
