= Bakanas (river) =

River in Kazakhstan

Bakanas Бақанас
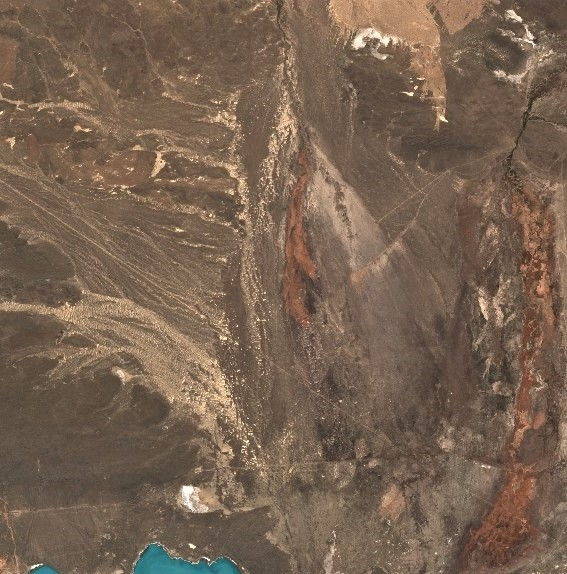
- Sentinel-2 image with the Bakanas' mouth fanning out southwards above in the middle

- Mouth location in Kazakhstan

Location
- Country: Kazakhstan

Physical characteristics
- Source: Chingiztau
  - coordinates: 48°31′21″N 79°0′38″E
  - elevation: 808 m (2,651 ft)
- Mouth: Balkhash-Alakol Basin
  - location: West of Aktogay
  - coordinates: 47°14′02″N 79°13′21″E
  - elevation: 384 m (1,260 ft)
- Length: 240 km (150 mi)
- Basin size: 25,100 km^{2} (9,700 sq mi)
- Discharge
  - average: 3.27 m^{3}/s (115 cu ft/s) (near Shubartau)

The Bakanas (Kazakh: Бақанас) is a river in the Abai Region, Kazakhstan. It has a length of 240 km (150 mi) and a drainage basin of 25,100 km^{2} (9,700 sq mi).

The Bakanas flows near Ayagoz city in its upper course. Barshatas town is located on the left bank of the river.

== Course ==
The Bakanas river originates in the Chingiztau range of the eastern Kazakh Uplands. Its source is in the southwestern slopes, near the Akbaytal mountain pass. It heads roughly southwards, bending southeastwards in its middle course after its confluence with the Dagandeli. Finally it fans out, divides into shallow arms, and its waters disperse in the semidesert sands to the north of the eastern end of the Balkhash lakeshore. Its mouth lies 25 km (16 mi) west of Aktogay town, in the East Kazakhstan Region. The river is fed mainly by snow, but it usually carries very little water, and only in the spring, beginning in late March or early April and ending in May or June. In some years it dries up in its lower course. Very rarely, in extremely wet years, the Bakanas flows from the right into the Ayaguz River, which has its mouth in Lake Balkhash.

=== Tributaries ===
The Bakanas freezes between December and March. Its main tributaries are the 203 km (126 mi) long Dagandeli, as well as the Alpeis, Tolen, Kyzylozen, Zhanibek, Balkybek and the 152 km (94 mi) long Koksala.

== See also ==
- List of rivers of Kazakhstan
