= Chingiztau =

Range of mountains in Kazakhstan

- Шыңғыстау
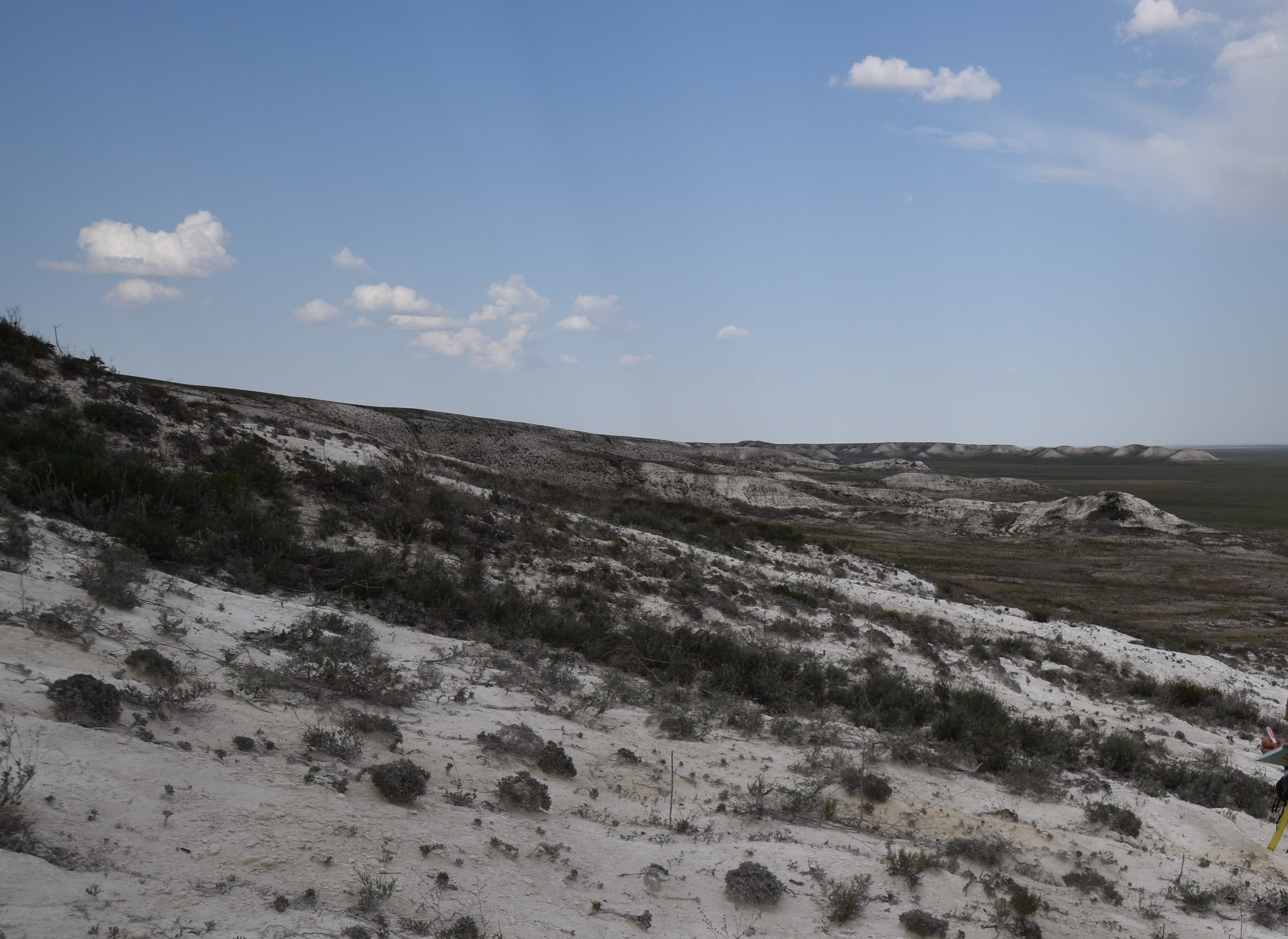
- View of the Akshatau subrange

Highest point
- Peak: Kosoba
- Elevation: 1,304 m (4,278 ft)
- Coordinates: 48°15′02″N 79°39′47″E

Dimensions
- Length: 200 km (120 mi) NW / SE
- Width: 50 km (31 mi) NE / SW

Geography
- Location within Kazakhstan
- Location: Kazakhstan
- Range coordinates: 48°38′N 79°10′E
- Parent range: Kazakh Uplands

Geology
- Orogeny: Alpine orogeny
- Rock age: Paleozoic
- Rock type(s): Sandstone, shale, limestone, porphyritic rocks

Chingiztau (Kazakh: Шыңғыстау) is a mountain range in Abai Region, Kazakhstan.

The nearest city is Ayagoz, located near the southern end of the range.

== Geography ==
Chingiztau is one of the ranges of the eastern part of the Kazakh Upland system (Saryarka). It stretches roughly for about 200 kilometers (120 mi) from northwest to southeast, 30 kilometers (19 mi) to the south of the Degelen. The range has three separate ridges: Kanchingiz (Қаншыңғыс), highest point 1,152 meters (3,780 ft) in the northern section, the Chingiztau proper in the middle, highest point 1,119 meters (3,671 ft), and Akshatau (Ақшатау) in the southern section, where there is highest point of the whole range system 1,304 meters (4,278 ft) Mount Kosoba.

The slopes of the ridges are generally abrupt in the eastern side and more gently sloping in the western. They are deeply dissected by river valleys and ravines. Numerous rivers have their origin in the range, but their waters are mostly lost either in the sands of the surrounding deserts or in seasonal salt lakes of the highlands. The largest rivers having their sources in the Chingiztau are the Shagan and its right tributary the Ashchysu flowing roughly northwards, as well as the Bakanas and a few tributaries of the Ayagöz flowing south. The Konyr-Auliye cave (Қоңыр әулие үңгірі) is located near Mount Aktas, off the western slopes of the range, near the Shagan river.

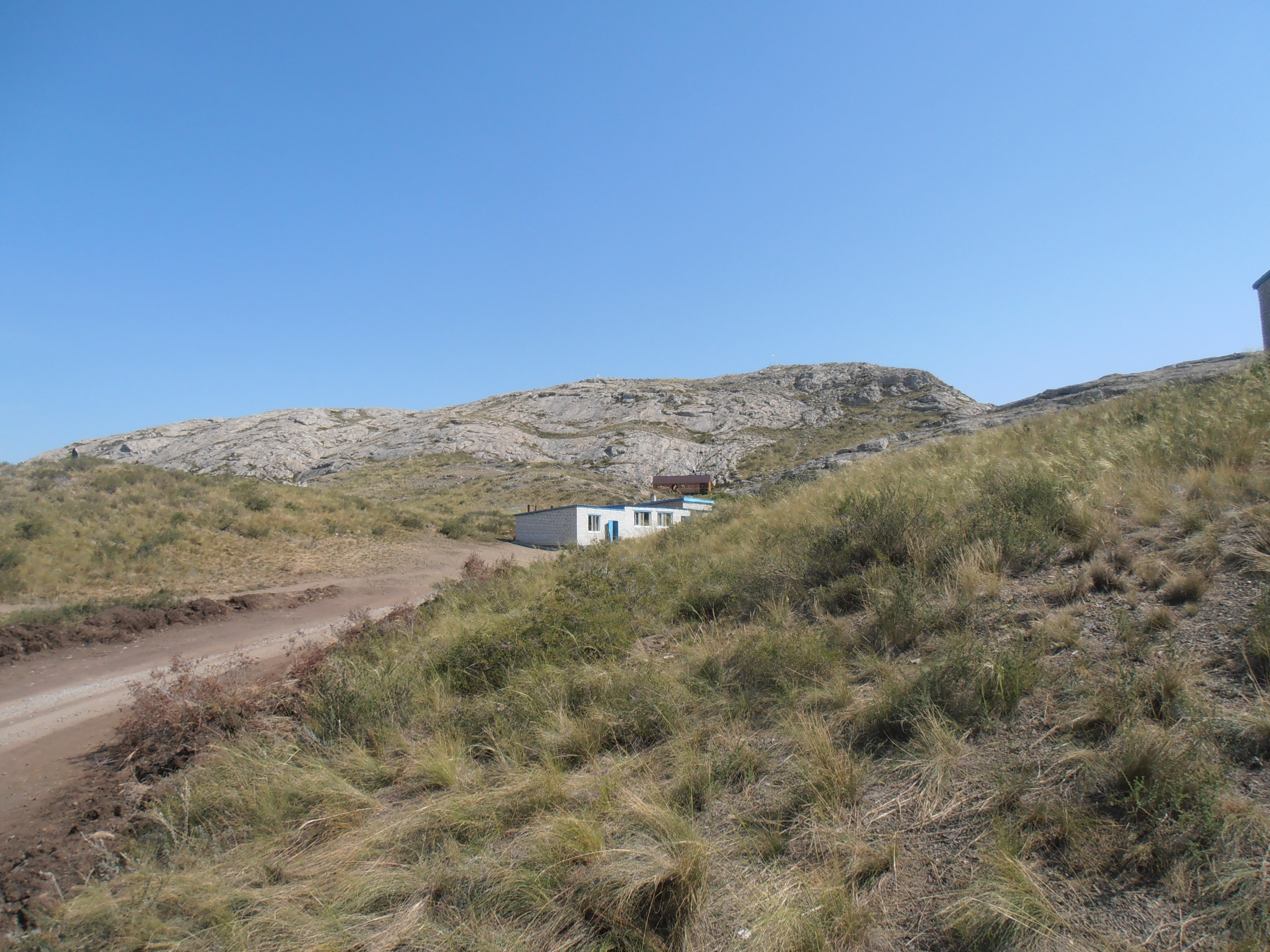
Near the Konyr-Auliye cave.

== Flora ==
The range slopes are covered by mountain steppe vegetation. There are aspen-birch forests and willow thickets in the valleys.

== See also ==
- Geography of Kazakhstan
