= Chagan (nuclear test) =

1965 Soviet underground nuclear test

Coordinates: 49°56′7″N 79°0′30″E

Information
- Country: Soviet Union
- Test site: Semipalatinsk Test Site
- Date: January 15, 1965
- Number of tests: 124
- Test type: Underground test
- Device type: Thermonuclear
- Max. yield: Total yield 140 kilotons of TNT (590 TJ)

Test chronology

Chagan (Чага́н) was a Soviet underground nuclear test conducted at the Semipalatinsk Test Site on January 15, 1965.

== Description ==
Chagan was the first and largest of the 124 detonations in the Nuclear Explosions for the National Economy program, designed to produce peaceful nuclear explosions (PNEs) for earth-moving purposes. The concept of using PNEs to create artificial lakes, harbors and canals was modeled after a United States program, Project Plowshare, which conducted the first peaceful nuclear explosion (the 104 kt Sedan shallow cratering test) at the Nevada Test Site in July 1962.

Described as a "near clone" of the Sedan shot, Chagan's yield was the equivalent of 140 kilotons of TNT and sought to produce a large conical crater suitable for a lake. The site was a dry bed of the Chagan River (tributary of Irtysh River) at the edge of the Semipalatinsk Test Site, and was chosen such that the lip of the crater would dam the river during its high spring flow. The resultant lake has a diameter of 408 m (1,339 ft) and is 100 m (330 ft) deep.

Shallow subsurface (open) cratering explosions such as Sedan or Chagan release a great deal of steam and pulverized rock along with approximately 20% of the device's fission products into the atmosphere. Although the vast majority of this fallout was deposited in the general area of the test, it also produced a small but measurable radioactive plume, which in Chagan's case was detected over Japan and initially prompted complaints from the US that the Soviets were violating the provisions of the October 1963 Limited Test Ban Treaty, which banned atmospheric tests and any vented (or "open") subsurface detonation which caused "radioactive debris to be present outside the territorial limits of the State under whose jurisdiction or control such explosion is conducted".

The device itself was a low fission-fraction design, meaning it produced only a small portion of its yield from fission and hence produced less fallout than a military device generally designed for low weight and/or size, and not fallout considerations. The device had a primary (fission) stage of 5 to 7 kilotonnes of TNT (21 to 29 TJ) and a purely thermonuclear secondary stage.

The photo of the Chagan shot is occasionally confused with that of the Soviet Joe 1 test. The correct image shows a squat, ground-level cloud similar to the Sedan shot rather than the tall mushroom cloud of the tower-detonated Joe-1.

== Lake Chagan ==
Lake Chagan or Lake Shagan, also known as Balapan, is a lake created at the confluence of rivers Shagan and Ashchysu by the Chagan nuclear test roughly 10,000,000 m^{3} (8,100 acre⋅ft) in size, is still radioactive, and has been called the "Atomic Lake". As at the Trinity site of the first United States nuclear weapon test in Alamogordo, New Mexico, the exposed rock and sand was melted into a glassy substance called trinitite.

== See also ==
- Sedan (nuclear test) – an American cratering detonation
