= Shagan (lake, Abai Region) =

Man-made lake in Kazakhstan created by a 1965 nuclear test

- Kazakh: Шаған / Şağan
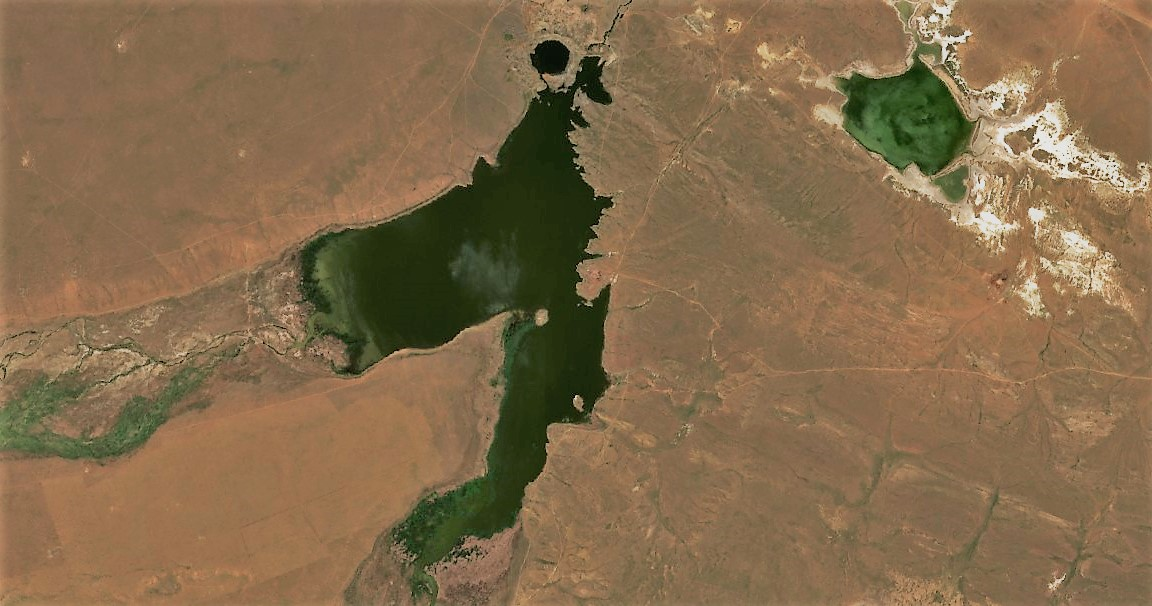
- Sentinel-2 of lake Shagan (center), with the round nuclear pothole at the top and the reservoir formed in the floodplain of the Shagan (left) and Ashchysu (bottom) rivers. Lake Zhanan, a sor, in the upper right.

- Location within Kazakhstan Location within Asia
- Coordinates: 49°56′7″N 79°0′30″E
- Primary inflows: Shagan and Ashchysu
- Primary outflows: Shagan (until 1965)
- Basin countries: Kazakhstan
- Max. length: 0.45 km (0.28 mi) (pothole)
- Max. width: 0.38 km (0.24 mi) (pothole)
- Surface area: 5.2 km^{2} (2.0 sq mi)
- Average depth: 49 m (161 ft)
- Max. depth: ca 100 m (330 ft)
- Water volume: 0.0191 cubic kilometers (0.0046 cu mi)
- Residence time: UTC+6
- Surface elevation: 315 m (1,033 ft)

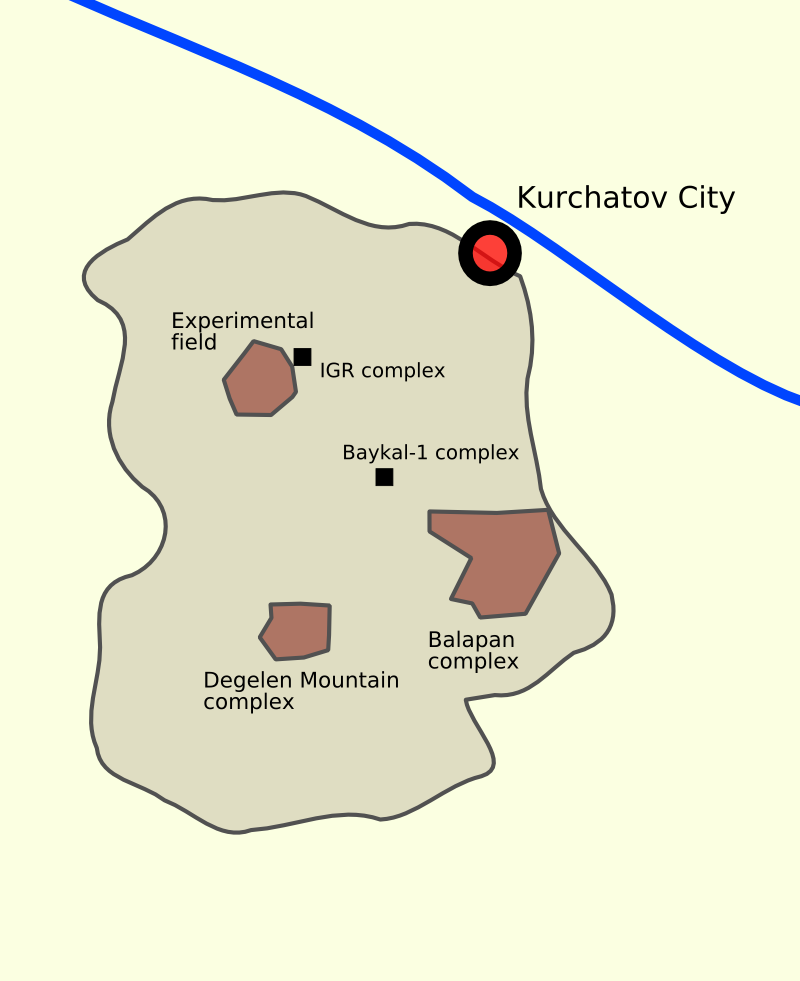
Location of the Balapan Complex within the Semipalatinsk Polygon.

Shagan (Kazakh: Шаған, romanized: Şağan) or Chagan (Russian: Чаган) is a lake in Zhanasemey District, Abai Region, Kazakhstan. Formed by a nuclear test explosion in 1965, it is part of the Balapan complex, one of the main tourist attractions of the Semipalatinsk Test Site.

== Geography ==
The lake lies 90 km (56 mi) to the south of the Irtysh and about 110 km (68 mi) to the southwest of Semey, formerly Semipalatinsk. The lake lies to the north of the confluence of the Shagan river, of the Irtysh basin, and its tributary the north-flowing Ashchysu. The Shagan river was channeled to fill the newly created crater until 1965. A few years later, a dam was built on the left bank of the river to control the water level in the reservoir that formed to the south. The reservoir still exists today, unchanged since the explosion. It is used to provide water for local cattle.

== History ==
The lake was formed in the area known as the Balapan Complex by the Chagan nuclear test on January 15, 1965, which was conducted as part of the Soviet Union's Nuclear Explosions for the National Economy program. A 140 kiloton device was placed in a 178-metre-deep (584 ft) hole in the dry bed at the confluence of the Shagan and Ashchysu rivers. The blast created a circular crater 400 m (1,300 ft) across and 100 m (330 ft) deep with a lip height of 20 to 38 m (66 to 125 ft). The crater was filled shortly after the nuclear blast by the water of the rivers and it is often referred to as "Atomic Lake" (Kazakh: Атом көлі). The crater lake's volume is approximately 10 million m^{3} (350 million ft^{3}). To the south, the rim of the crater holds back the waters of a two-lobed reservoir.

It was estimated that some 20% of the radioactive products from the Chagan test escaped the blast zone, and were detected over Japan. This infuriated the United States for violating the provisions of the October 1963 Limited Test Ban Treaty, which banned atmospheric tests.

The water continues to be radioactive – about 100 times more than the permitted level of radionuclides in the water. Locals fish in the lake, despite warnings by authorities that it is hazardous.

== Media ==
In Netflix's documentary series Dark Tourist (season 1 episode 4, "The Stans"), David Farrier visits and swims in Lake Chagan, and eats a fish from the lake, during his tour of Kazakhstan.

== See also ==
- Sedan (nuclear test) – an American cratering detonation
- Pechora–Kama Canal – a proposed canal project involving nuclear excavation
- Lake Karachay – a natural lake highly contaminated by the dumping of high-level nuclear waste
- Volcanic crater lake – a body of water normally formed by volcanic or meteoric events
