= Operation Fakel =

Nuclear explosion in Ukraine (1972)

Information
- Country: Soviet Union
- Test site: Near Krestyshche, Krasnohrad Raion, Kharkiv Oblast, Ukrainian SSR (now Ukraine)
- Coordinates: 49°28′47″N 35°29′41″E
- Date: 07:00 UTC July 9, 1972; 54 years ago
- Test type: Underground (peaceful nuclear explosion) to seal/extinguish a gas well blowout
- Max. yield: 3.8 kt TNT equivalent
- Outcome: reported failure to stop blowout (required months of conventional mitigation)

Operation Fakel (Russian: Операция «Факел» (Operation "Torch")) was a Soviet peaceful nuclear explosion (PNE) conducted in 1972 in the Ukrainian Soviet Socialist Republic. It was part of the Soviet program Nuclear Explosions for the National Economy and was intended to seal a runaway gas well blowout near the village of Krestyshche in Kharkiv Oblast by collapsing surrounding rock strata at depth. The attempt was unsuccessful and the blowout was capped by conventional methods.

== Background ==
In 1971 there was an accident while drilling Well Number 35, a gas rig that was part of the development of gas extraction from the Mashivka-Shebelinka natural gas field. Well No. 35 was located near the village of Khrestyshche, Ukraine, between Kharkiv and Dnipro. In the 1971 incident there was a high-pressure gas condensate blowout, which killed two engineers. After the failure of traditional techniques to cap the well to prevent further gas leakage, the leak was deliberately ignited to manage the risk of uncontrolled explosions.

Separately, during the 1960s–1980s, the Soviet Union conducted underground nuclear detonations for industrial and engineering applications under the rubric of 'peaceful nuclear explosions'. One proposed application was the emergency sealing of runaway oil and gas well leaks, that could not be controlled by conventional techniques.

== Explosion ==
In July 1972 Operation Fakel was set in motion, in an attempt to suppress the ignited gas gusher, or torch, by setting off a subterranean nuclear explosion alongside the well shaft. A U.S. national laboratory review of Soviet peaceful nuclear explosions reported that a 3.8 kiloton device was detonated at a depth of 2,483 metres in a salt formation near the runaway well in the Krestyshche gas formation, north of Krasnohrad (and southwest of Kharkiv). The relatively small yield suggested that the emplacement hole was drilled close to the runaway well shaft, at shot depth. The date is reported inconsistently across sources: the LLNL review gives 7 July 1972, while nuclear-test listings and multiple later summaries cite 9 July 1972 (including 10:00 local time).

== Outcome ==
According to the World Nuclear Association, the 1972 Ukrainian PNE intended to extinguish a natural-gas-field fire was unsuccessful. A CTBTO conference abstract presented by a representative of Ukraine’s Main Centre of Special Monitoring likewise stated that the explosion did not reach its goal. The RBC-Ukraine news agency reported that the explosion caused the flame to be extinguished for 20 seconds, but thereafter the blowout gusher resumed, and with a visible nuclear mushroom cloud. The well was sealed over several more months, using conventional methods..

== Safety, health, and environmental concerns ==
=== Reported fatalities and immediate impacts ===
The initial blowout accident in 1971 led to the deaths of two engineers, thrown from the upper platform of the drilling rig. After the 1972 explosion there was a report that test animals held in restricted zones died prematurely, and that information about radioactive contamination was classified.

=== Evacuation, secrecy, and public notification ===
In the immediate lead-up to the 1972 explosion there was a temporary evacuation of local residents from the immediate area as a safety precaution, but the residents were not given details of the nuclear related activities that were being carried out. Some windows were shattered in one village. Details were concealed for decades as part of Soviet secrecy practices and only became more public knowledge in 2015 with the release of Ukrainian archives.

=== Radiation exposure and long-term monitoring ===
Independently verifiable radiation dose measurements for Operation Fakel are limited in public sources, given that contamination details counted as classified information. A U.S. laboratory review cites Soviet claims (attributed to MinAtom) that post-shot surveys detected no radioactivity above background at the surface for the well-sealing applications, but does not provide independent raw measurement data for the Fakel site. Ukrainian media accounts have mentioned alleged local environmental effects, with speculative and unconfirmed dose ranges, while noting that official radiation data remains unavailable or classified.

== Significance and legacy in Ukraine ==
Operation Fakel has been identified as an example of the use of high-risk industrial experiments in the Soviet-era, on the territory of the Ukrainian SSR, with limited transparency and uncertain long-term public-health accountability. Operation Fakel was not the only example of this, with a second Soviet peaceful nuclear explosion conducted in the Ukrainian SSR, near Klivazh in 1979. The incidents flagged concerns about the lack of both environmental oversight and public information, as part of the legacy of Soviet nuclear-industrial policies in Ukraine.
