= Ashchysu (Shagan) =

River in Kazakhstan

Ashchysu Ащысу
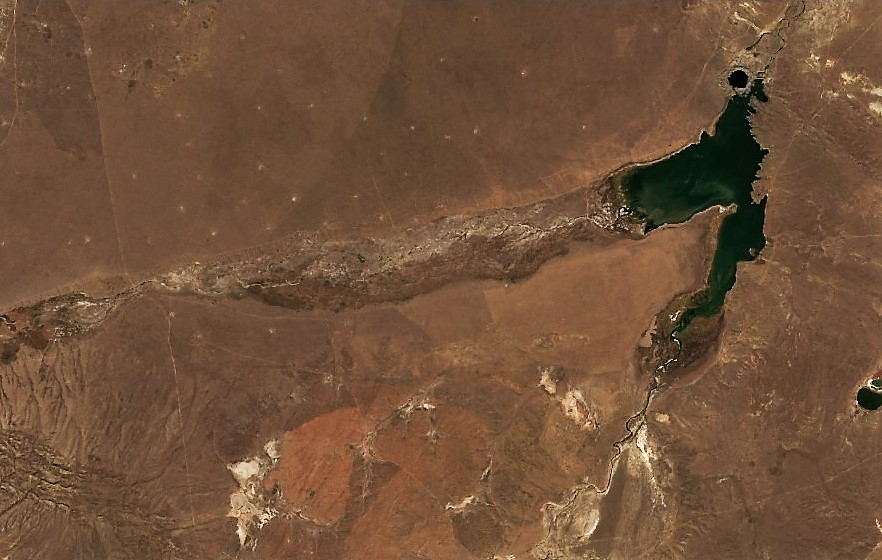
- Lake at the confluence of the Shagan and Ashchysu rivers

- Mouth location in Kazakhstan

Physical characteristics
- Source: Kazakh Uplands
  - location: Chingiztau
  - coordinates: 48°31′57″N 81°03′54″E
  - elevation: 1,050 metres (3,440 ft)
- Mouth: Shagan
  - coordinates: 49°55′17″N 79°0′47″E
- Length: 305 km (190 mi)
- Basin size: 18,100 km^{2} (7,000 sq mi)
- Discharge
  - average: 0.34 m^{3}/s (12 cu ft/s) (near Ushbiik railway station)

Basin features
- Progression: Shagan → Irtysh→ Ob→ Kara Sea

The Ashchysu (Kazakh: Ащысу) is a river in the Abai Region, Kazakhstan and a tributary of the Shagan, of the Irtysh basin. The river is 349 km (217 mi) long and the area of its basin is 18,100 km^{2} (7,000 sq mi).

== Geography ==
The Ashchysu has its sources in the northeastern slopes of the Chingiztau, a range of the eastern sector of the Kazakh Uplands, about 30 km (19 mi) northwest of the city of Ayagoz. It heads initially westwards, then it bends southwestwards and passes Ushbiik, then, in its lower course it bends again and heads roughly northwestwards. Finally it meets the right bank of the Shagan 110 km (68 mi) to the southwest of Semey, former Semipalatinsk, city. The confluence is located on the Balapan field of the Semipalatinsk Test Site complex. A lake was formed as a result of an experimental nuclear explosion to create a reservoir in January 1965.

The Ashchysu is fed mainly by snow and in the summer it often dries up.

== See also ==
- List of rivers of Kazakhstan
- Lake Shagan
