= Shagan (Irtysh) =

Shagan Шаған
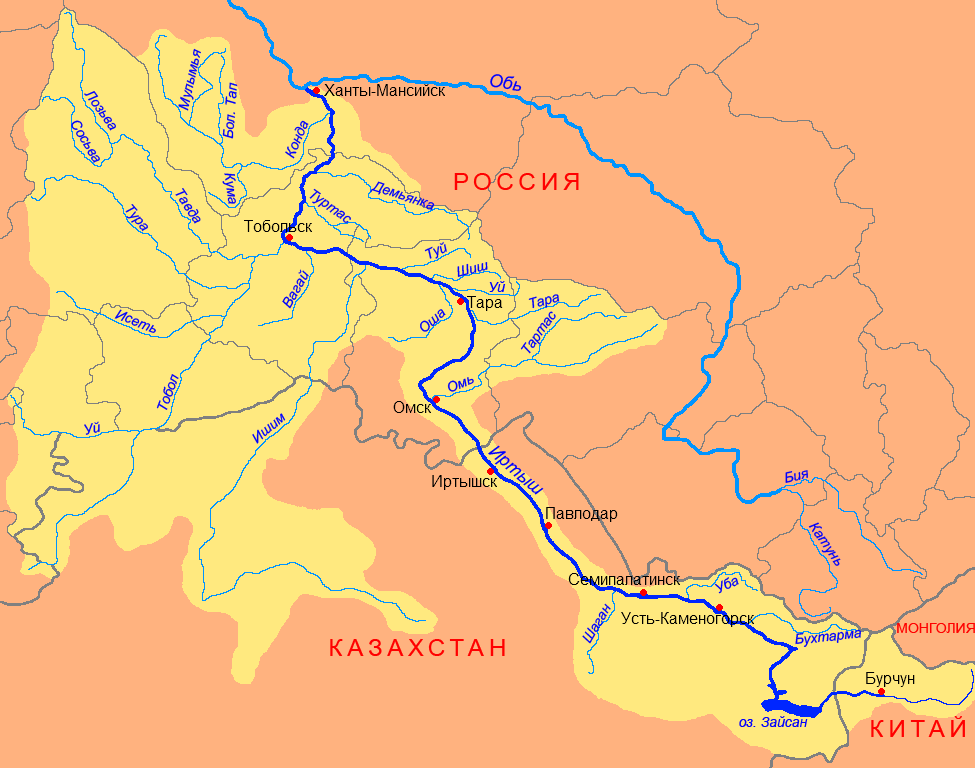
- Irtysh basin with the Shagan in the lower right

- Mouth location in Kazakhstan

Physical characteristics
- Source: Kazakh Uplands
  - location: Chingiztau
  - coordinates: 48°39′51″N 78°29′03″E
  - elevation: 915 metres (3,002 ft)
- Mouth: Irtysh
  - coordinates: 50°37′55″N 79°15′45″E
- Length: 275 km (171 mi)
- Basin size: 25,400 km^{2} (9,800 sq mi)
- Discharge
  - average: 1.02 m^{3}/s (36 cu ft/s)

Basin features
- Progression: Irtysh→ Ob→ Kara Sea

The Shagan (Kazakh: Шаған - Şağan; Russian: Чаган - Chagan), is a river in the Zhanasemey, Abai and Beskaragay districts of Abai Region, east Kazakhstan. It is a tributary of the Irtysh. The river is 275 km (171 mi) long and the area of its basin is 25,400 km^{2} (9,800 sq mi).

== Geography ==
The Shagan has its sources in the northwestern slopes of the Chingiztau, a subrange of the Kazakh Uplands. It heads mainly northwards along semi-desert areas all along its course. Finally it meets the left bank of the Irtysh 275 km (171 mi) to the west of Semey, former Semipalatinsk, city. Its food is mainly snow and the river is under ice between November and April. It flows during the spring floods, from May to June. In the summer it dries up or breaks up into disconnected pools. Its main tributary is the Ashchysu from the right,

== History ==
The lower course of the Shagan is located in the Balapan Complex area of the Semipalatinsk Polygon, the primary testing venue for the Soviet Union's nuclear weapons. The river flows from the western boundary of the test site and fills the "Atomic Lake" Lake Shagan (or Lake Balapan), a lake created by the Chagan nuclear test at the confluence with the Ashchysu. The lake was formed at the confluence with the Ashchysu in January 1965.

== See also ==
- List of rivers of Kazakhstan
