= North Kawnpui =

- Location within Mizoram Location within India
- Coordinates: 24.0513400°N 92.6721900°E
- Country: India
- State: Mizoram
- District: Kolasib
- Founder: Chanchinmawia

Population (2023)
  - Total: 25,733

Languages
  - Official: Mizo
- Time zone: UTC+5:30 (IST)
- Vehicle registration: MZ
- Website: mizoram.nic.in

North Kawnpui is a census town in Kolasib district in the Indian state of Mizoram.
