= November 1964 =

Month of 1964

<<	November 1964					>>
Su	Mo	Tu	We	Th	Fr	Sa
1	2	3	4	5	6	7
8	9	10	11	12	13	14
15	16	17	18	19	20	21
22	23	24	25	26	27	28
29	30

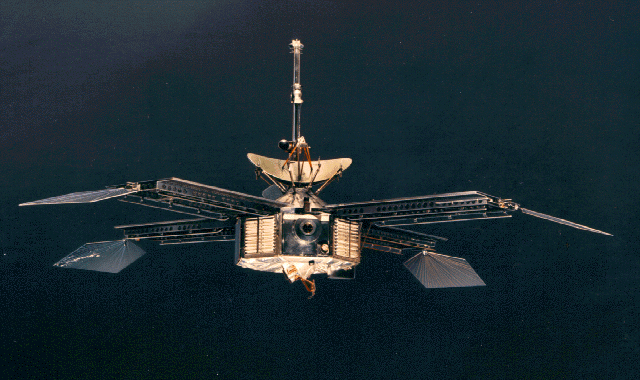
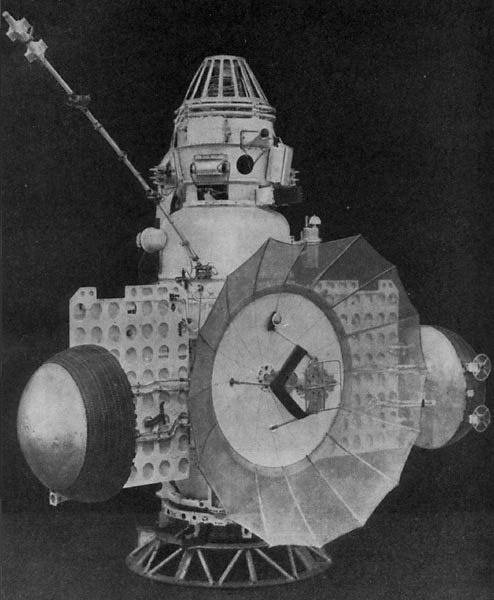
November 28 and 30, 1964: Mariner 4 and Zond 2 race to Mars

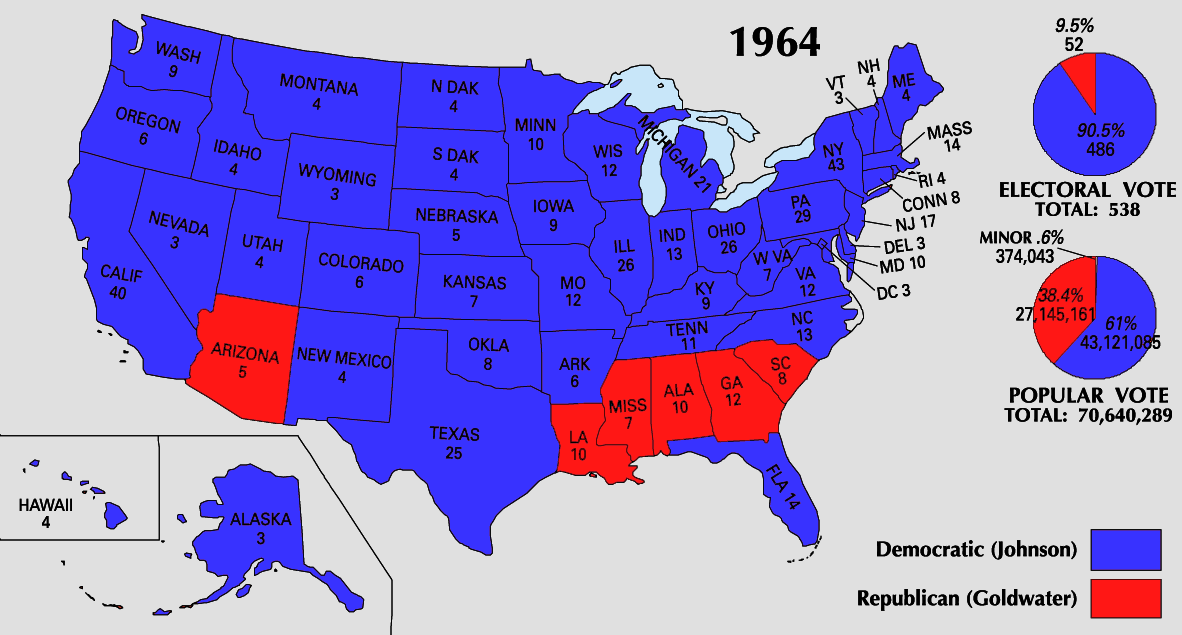
November 3, 1964: Lyndon Johnson wins 44 of 50 states in U.S. presidential election

The following events occurred in November 1964:

== November 1, 1964 (Sunday) ==
- Viet Cong infiltrators staged a mortar attack on Bien Hoa Air Base in South Vietnam, destroying five U.S. Air Force B-57 Canberra bombers, a U.S. Air Force HH-43F helicopter, and four Republic of Vietnam Air Force A-1 Skyraider attack aircraft, and damaging 15 B-57 bombers and some HH-43F helicopters. Five servicemen were killed and 72 wounded. The attack happened shortly after midnight Indochina Time (after 1700 hrs 10/31 UTC, or after 12 noon 10/31 in Washington).
- The Studebaker Corporation announced a bankruptcy settlement of its debts owned on its retirement pension plans. Although people who were already drawing full benefits would continue to do so, and workers who had at least 10 years of service and were at least 60 years old got full payment, all other participants got little or nothing. Lump sums representing about 15% of accrued benefits were paid to 4,080 participants, who got between $200 and $1,600 if they had 10 years' service and were between 40 and 59 years old. The 2,900 remaining employees who were less than 40 or who had less than 10 years got nothing back from their plan contributions.
- Born: Daran Norris (stage name for Daran Morrison Nordlund), American voice actor best known for The Fairly OddParents, in the role of both the father (Mr. Turner) and the fairy godfather (Cosmo); in Ferndale, Washington

== November 2, 1964 (Monday) ==
- King Saud was forced from the throne and his younger brother, 59-year old Prince Faisal, was proclaimed as the new King of Saudi Arabia. Saud departed into an exile in Greece, and would die of a heart attack at his hotel suite in Athens on February 23, 1969. King Faisal would rule until being assassinated in 1975.
- The Royal Dutch Shell oil corporation announced that it had found a large expanse of oil beneath the Sultanate of Oman in the southeast Arabian Peninsula, with an expected output of 140,000 barrels per day by 1967.
- The purchase of baseball's New York Yankees by the Columbia Broadcasting System became effective with the payment of $14.4 million to owners Dan Topping and Del Webb by CBS.
- A U.S. Air Force HH-43F helicopter based at Bien Hoa Air Base, South Vietnam, conducted the first night rescue by the Air Force's Air-Sea Rescue Service in Southeast Asia.
- Stars appearing in front of Queen Elizabeth II of the United Kingdom at the annual Royal Variety Performance in London included Tommy Cooper, The Bachelors, Cilla Black, Millicent Martin, Kathy Kirby, Brenda Lee, Morecambe and Wise, Gracie Fields, Jimmy Tarbuck, Cliff Richard & The Shadows, Bob Newhart and Lena Horne.

== November 3, 1964 (Tuesday) ==
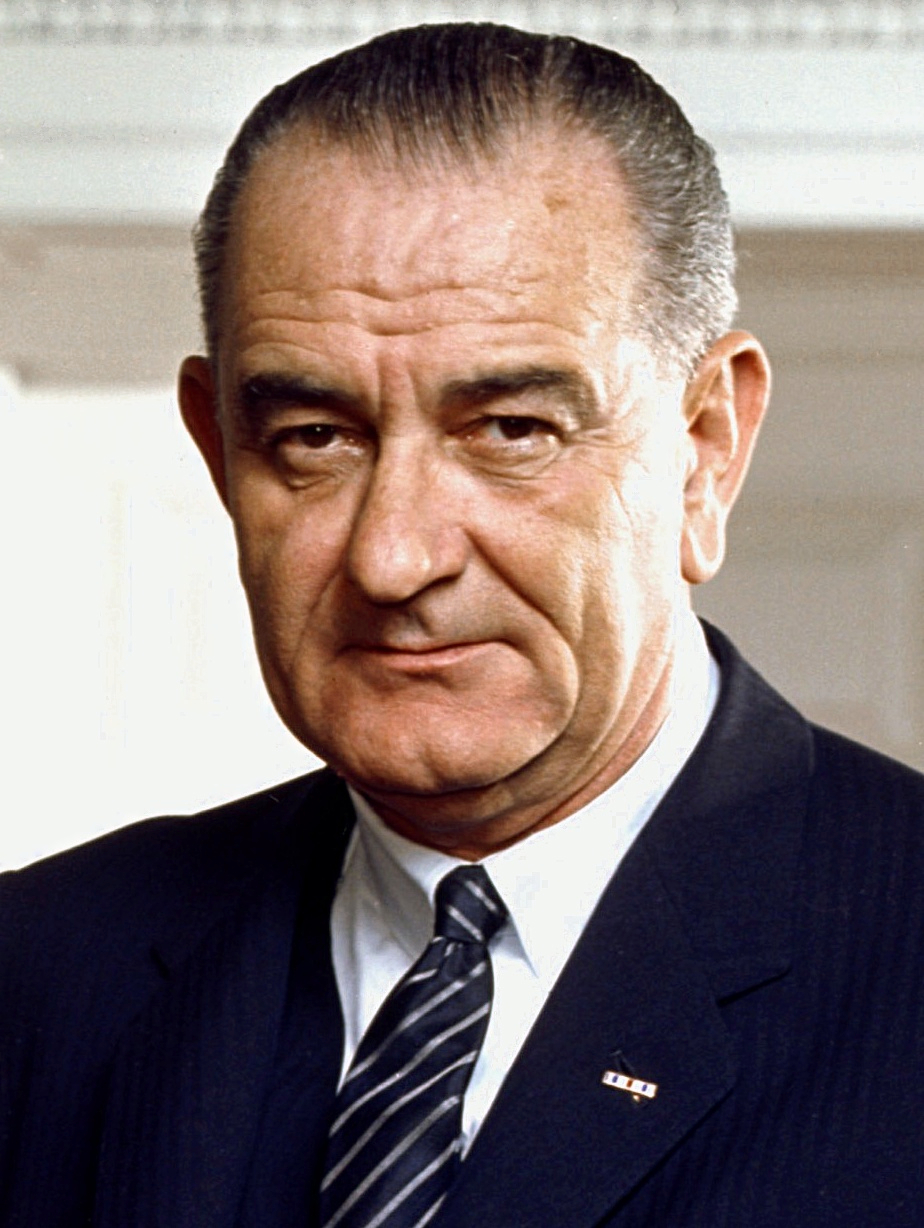
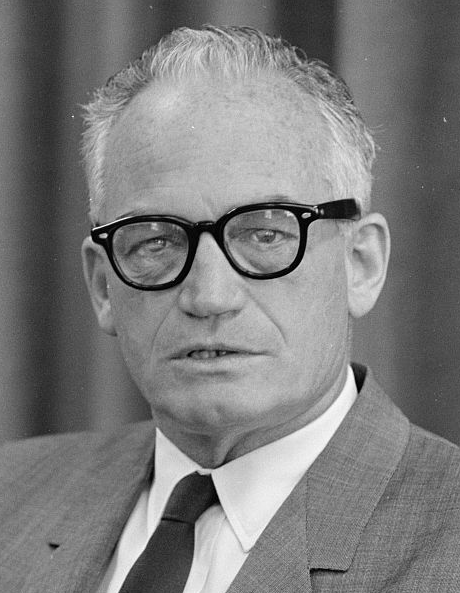
Johnson (Democrat) and Goldwater (Republican)
- In the 1964 United States presidential election, President Lyndon Johnson defeated his Republican challenger, U.S. Senator Barry Goldwater with a record of 61.05 percent of the popular vote and the electoral votes of 44 of the 50 states. Johnson received 43,127,041 out of 70,639,284 votes and Goldwater got 27,175,770; he also got 486 electors to Goldwater's 52. The election marked a change in traditional voting patterns, with five Democratic Party states in the Deep South (Louisiana, Mississippi, Alabama, Georgia and South Carolina) being carried by Goldwater and nearly all of the commonly Republican Party strongholds favoring Johnson. The Johnson/Humphrey ticket received no votes in Alabama because no Democratic party electors were on the ballot in that state; 210,732 of the 689,817 votes cast there went to other presidential candidates.
- Nationwide voting also gave the Democrats a larger majority in the House of Representatives (295 to 140 over the Republicans) and in the Senate (a 68 to 32 advantage).
- Eduardo Frei Montalva was inaugurated for a six-year term as the 29th President of Chile.
- Born:
  - Brenda Fassie, South African singer known as MaBrrr and nicknamed "The Queen of African Pop" (d. 2004); in Langa, Cape Town
  - Scott Galloway (professor), American academic, author, podcast host, entrepreneur; in San Diego
  - Paprika Steen, Danish film actress; as Kirstie Steen in Frederiksberg

== November 4, 1964 (Wednesday) ==
- Iran's Ayatollah Ruhollah Khomeini was arrested after denouncing the Shah of Iran, sentenced to exile, put on an airplane in Tehran, and flown to the city of Bursa in Turkey. In the evening, the government issued a statement that "Based on credible information, evidence, and sufficient reasons against Mr. Khomeini and threats imposed by him against the national interest, security, independence, and territorial integrity of the country, he has been exiled from Iran on 13 Aban 1343." After a year in Turkey, Khomeini would move to Iraq until 1978; he would become the leader of Iran in 1979 after successfully advocating the overthrow of the Shah.
- In Bolivia, the government of President Víctor Paz Estenssoro was overthrown in a coup led by General Alfredo Ovando Candía, commander-in-chief of the armed forces, and Paz was replaced by his Vice-President, General René Barrientos, who had assisted in the plot. The overthrow brought an end to 12 years of rule by the Movimiento Nacionalista Revolucionario (MNR) political party, the Revolutionary Nationalist Movement. Paz was sent into exile in Peru, but would return in 1971 and would become president again from 1985 to 1989.
- The burial of NASA astronaut Theodore Freeman, who had died in a plane crash on October 31, took place at Arlington National Cemetery, the day after his funeral at Seabrook Methodist Church in Texas. All 28 active astronauts, as well as John Glenn, who had recently retired from the astronaut corps, attended both events. Freeman's burial was the final occasion in history when all of NASA's past and present astronauts were together in the same place.
- Trần Văn Hương was installed as the new Prime Minister of South Vietnam as part of a civilian government selected by the nation's military leaders.

== November 5, 1964 (Thursday) ==
- Mariner 3, a U.S. space probe intended to make the first flyby of Mars, was successfully launched from Cape Kennedy, but the lightweight heat-shielding shroud that had been used to protect its instruments from air friction had melted and failed to separate after the Atlas-Agena rocket left the atmosphere. Because the protective shroud was stuck to the payload, the $25,000,000 Mariner's solar panels were unable to unfold and the craft could not be controlled after it achieved solar orbit. The problem with the shroud's design would be determined in time to prevent the same thing from happening to Mariner 4 three weeks later.
- King Sobhuza II opened the Swaziland Railway in a dedication ceremony, with railroad tracks crossing the landlocked South African kingdom for the first time. The railway line did not originally transport passengers and, as the official history states, "was established for the sole purpose of transporting a single commodity – iron ore", specifically between the Ngwenya Mine (on the western edge of the nation) and the village of Goba, Mozambique (across the border from the eastern edge).
- In West Germany, the cabinet of Chancellor Ludwig Erhard voted against seeking an extension of the 20-year statute of limitations for prosecution of war crimes, though it would not announce its decision until November 11. Without an extension, six months remained for the indictment of former Nazis, who would not face prosecution after May 6, 1965.
- Died:
  - Vasily Nemchinov, 70, Soviet mathematician and economist who provided the groundwork for the Communist theory of a centrally-planned economy.
  - Lansdale Ghiselin Sasscer, 71, American politician and U.S. Representative for Maryland for six terms between 1939 and 1953.
  - John S. Robertson, 86, Canadian film director
  - Mabel Lucie Attwell, 85, British illustrator

== November 6, 1964 (Friday) ==
- Uganda's Prime Minister Milton Obote gave instructions to the African nation's security police "to use such powers as they have to protect the lives and the properties of the public" and gave authorization to use deadly force against civilians as they felt necessary. Four days later, in the Naakulabye neighborhood in the capital, Kampala, police responded to a husband and wife argument by firing their weapons into a crowd of people who had gathered around to see what was happening, killing six of them indiscriminately.
- Died:
  - Samuil Samosud, 80, conductor of the Moscow Philharmonic Symphony Orchestra
  - Hans von Euler-Chelpin, 91, German-born chemist, Nobel Prize laureate

== November 7, 1964 (Saturday) ==
- Soviet Communist Party leader Leonid Brezhnev attempted to mend relations with the People's Republic of China by hosting Chinese Prime Minister Zhou Enlai and his advisers in Moscow on the anniversary of the Bolshevik revolution, the first celebration since the removal of Nikita Khrushchev as leader three weeks earlier. However, the position of China's Mao Zedong (declared the same day in the party newspaper People's Daily) was that reconciliation was not possible so long as the Soviets continued to appease "United States imperialism" and to attempt a peaceful co-existence with "the common enemy" of Communism. Another historian notes that any patching of relations "that had seemed possible after Khrushchev's fall evaporated after the Soviet minister of defense, Rodion Malinovsky... approached Chinese Marshal He Long, member of the Chinese delegation to Moscow, and asked when China would finally get rid of Mao like the CPSU had disposed of Khrushchev."
- At the annual parade of new weapons through Red Square in Moscow, the Soviets displayed the first anti-ballistic missile, referred to as the ABM-1 Galosh by NATO and the A-350 by the Soviet military. The large new weapon — 60 feet (18 m) long, 8 feet (2.4 m) in diameter and driven by four motors, was described as being capable of destroying incoming missiles at great distances and "was an unexpected surprise to Western intelligence analysts".
- Born:
  - Dana Plato (stage name for Dana Michelle Strain), American child actress who portrayed Kimberly Drummond on Diff'rent Strokes (d. 1999); in Maywood, California
  - Michael Papajohn, American actor.
  - Peter Flinth, Danish film director.

== November 8, 1964 (Sunday) ==
- The opening ceremony of the 2nd Summer Paralympics (also known as the 13th International Stoke Mandeville Games) was held in Tokyo, with 5,000 spectators and 369 athletes from 22 nations. Japan's Crown Prince Akihito declared the games open.
- A ceasefire went into effect at 1:00 between the royalist and the republican factions in the North Yemen Civil War but would last for less than a month.
- Habib Bourguiba was re-elected as President of Tunisia without opposition, in that the Socialist Destourian Party was the only legal political party in nation.
- Consecration of the Sri Sithi Vinayagar Temple took place in Petaling Jaya, Selangor, Malaysia.
- Died: Joseph Francis Rummel, 78, Roman Catholic Archbishop of New Orleans since 1935

== November 9, 1964 (Monday) ==
- Dr. Bertram D. Cohn of the Maimonides Medical Center in Brooklyn applied for the patent to the earliest version of the inferior vena cava filter, beginning "[t]he modern era of limited surgical invasive prophylaxis of pulmonary embolism", and would be granted U.S. patent number 3,334,629 on August 8, 1967. During the same year that Dr. Cohn's patent was granted, Dr. Kazi Mobin-Uddin of the University of Miami would create the filter that "would be the first to gain wide acceptance in clinical use", called the "umbrella filter" because its six spokes opened to widen the inferior vena cava, the large vein that brings blood into the right atrium of the heart.
- Typhoon Joan struck South Vietnam quickly after Typhoon Iris and parts of North Vietnam, temporarily halting most Vietnam War operations and causing torrential rains and floods that would kill more than 5,000 people. The floods affected 13 provinces in South Vietnam, with most of the dead in the Quảng Ngãi, Quảng Nam and Quảng Tín provinces.
- The new Labour Party government of Britain's Prime Minister Wilson narrowly overcame a vote of no confidence, raised by the Conservative opposition in opposition to Labour's plans to again nationalize the British steel industry. The motion failed, 300 to 307, in the House of Commons.
- Eisaku Satō was sworn in as the new Prime Minister of Japan on the retirement of Hayato Ikeda. In his inaugural speech, he pledged to bring the island of Okinawa, which had been under American control since Japan's surrender in World War II, back to Japanese sovereignty.

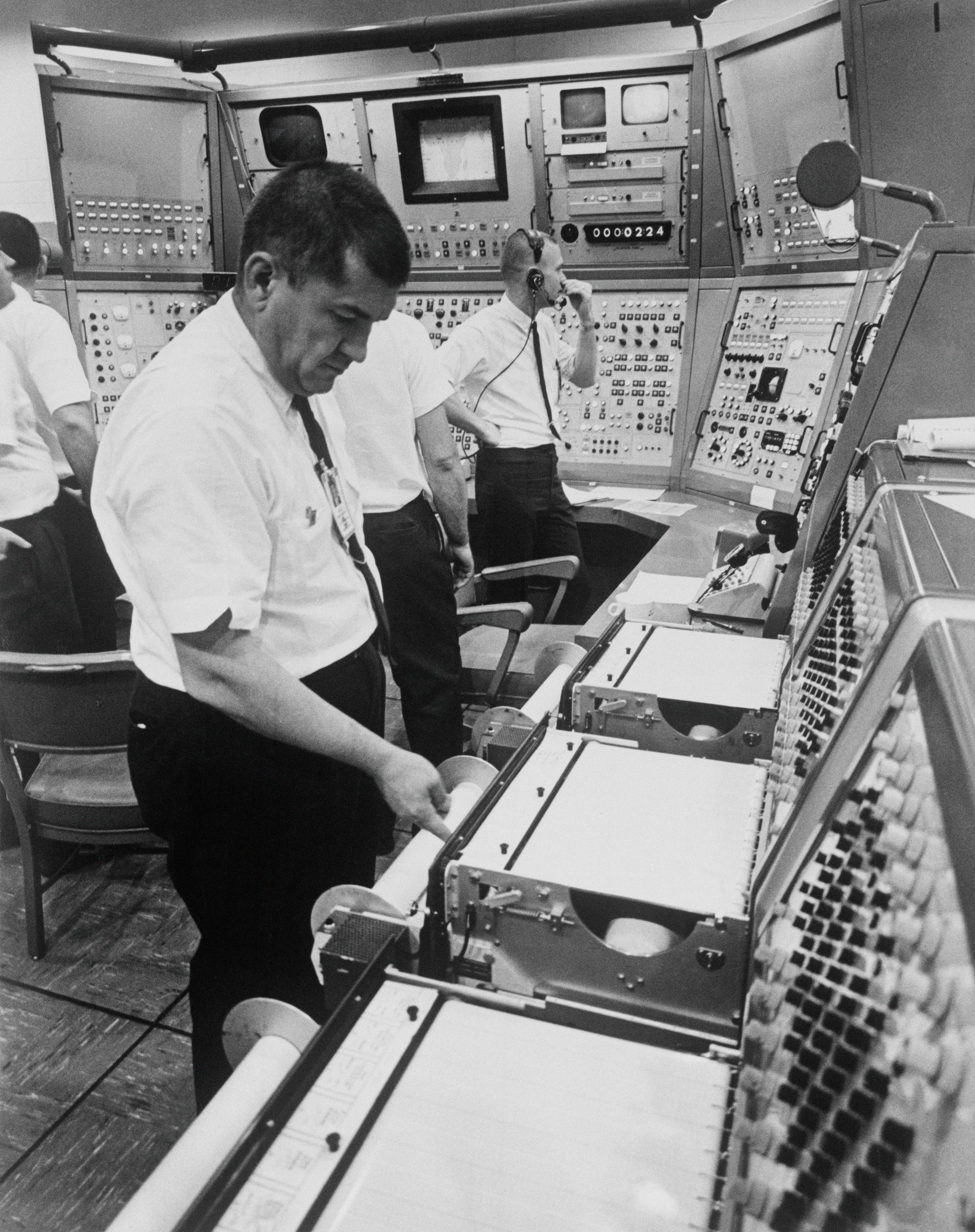
NASA technicians at Gemini mission simulator console

- The Gemini mission simulator at Cape Kennedy became operational. During the next three weeks, various Gemini flight crew would log 40 hours on the simulator.
- Prime Minister Lester Pearson approved a minor revision of the new Flag of Canada before submitting it to the approval of Canada's Parliament. Although George Stanley's winning proposal of a red maple leaf on white background between two red bars remained the same, designer Jacques Saint-Cyr revised the number of points on the leaf from 13 to 11.
- Born: Pepa (stage name for Sandra Jacqueline Denton), Jamaican-born American hip hop artist and part of the group Salt-N-Pepa; in Kingston
- Died: Cecília Meireles, 63, Brazilian poet and educator

== November 10, 1964 (Tuesday) ==
- The "Porsche 901" sports car, introduced at the Paris Auto Show the previous month, was rebranded as the Porsche 911 after 82 of the vehicles had been constructed. French automaker Peugeot had objected to the designation with the claim "that it held all the rights to all car model numbers with zero as the middle digit", and the West German Porsche company "elected to switch rather than fight French logic."
- British Prime Minister Wilson's government survived its second vote of no confidence in as many days. The second motion, which failed, 294 to 315, was over the Labour government's proposals for free health care, larger pensions, and higher taxes, "to take from citizens according to their means, to give to citizens according to their means."
- Prime Minister Robert Menzies of Australia announced his intent to introduce legislation to revive National Service, the compulsory military service for young men aged 20 and older. The move was made in response to the Indonesian Confrontation.
- American physicist Glenn T. Seaborg was awarded U.S. patent no. 3,156,523 for his development of the chemical element Americium, number 95 on the periodic table; he would receive a patent for Curium on December 15.
- Kenya effectively became a one-party state, as the remaining 23 legislators of the short-lived Kenya African Democratic Union (KADU) returned to the Kenya African National Union (KANU).
- Born:
  - Magnus Scheving, Icelandic producer and former gymnast known for creating the children's show LazyTown and portraying its athletic star, Sportacus; in Borgarnes
  - Kenny Rogers, American baseball player; in Savannah, Georgia
- Died:
  - Jimmie Dodd, 54, American actor and TV personality known for hosting The Mickey Mouse Club, died of lung cancer following his long history of cigarette smoking.
  - Emil Sick, 70, American beer brewer and Seattle baseball team owner

== November 11, 1964 (Wednesday) ==
- The body of Marcus Garvey, a proponent of African-American nationalism and founder of the Universal Negro Improvement Association (UNIA), was reinterred 24 years after his death, in a special ceremony held at his homeland of Jamaica. A crowd of thousands of admirers paid their final respects, and Garvey was proclaimed as the first National Hero of Jamaica.
- Born: Calista Flockhart, American actress known for portraying Ally McBeal in the television show of the same name; in Freeport, Illinois

== November 12, 1964 (Thursday) ==
- Charlotte, Grand Duchess of Luxembourg, abdicated as the monarch of the small Western European nation of 320,000 people, after a reign of 45 years. Her son, Jean, became the new Grand Duke of Luxembourg. Charlotte had ascended the throne in 1919 after the abdication of her older sister, the Grand Duchess Marie-Adélaïde; Jean would abdicate the throne in 2000 in favor of his son, Henri.
- The televised, public execution of the surviving two members of the Jeune Haiti rebels was conducted by a firing squad on orders of Haiti's President, François "Papa Doc" Duvalier. Louis Drouin and Marcel Numa had been part of a 13-man guerrilla team that had tried in August to overthrow Duvalier's dictatorship. Duvalier directed that the schoolchildren of Port-au-Prince be brought to watch the event, which took place outside of the walls of the national cemetery. Channel 5, the nation's only television station, covered the event for rebroadcast.
- Born: David Ellefson, American thrash metal bass guitarist for Megadeth; in Jackson, Minnesota
- Born: Charles Evered, American writer and director in Passaic, New Jersey
- Died: Fred Hutchinson, 45, manager of the baseball's Cincinnati Reds died less than a year after being diagnosed with cancer. Hutchinson, in his 13th season guiding a major league baseball team, had managed the Reds through the first 109 games of their 162-game 1964 season before stepping down because of his illness on August 12.

== November 13, 1964 (Friday) ==
- David Russell, a homeless transient, became the first apparent victim of a serial killer who would become known as the "Skid Row Slasher"; Russell's body was found on the steps of the central building of the Los Angeles Public Library. The next day, the body of 67-year old Benjamin Hornberg, was found in the restroom of a skid row hotel. Both men had been stabbed multiple times before their throats had been slashed, ear-to-ear. For the next ten years, there would be no similar killings; during a two-month period in December 1974 and January 1975, Vaughn Greenwood would murder nine more transients in a similar fashion before being apprehended.
- Syria fired artillery from the Golan Heights at Kibbutz Dan and at Sha'ar Yishuv, two Jewish settlements on the other side of its border with Israel. In retaliation, the Israeli Air Force conducted a massive air strike on positions in Syria, "taking the opportunity to destroy the Syrian diversion equipment" that was being used to reroute the waters of the Jordan River away from Israel, and sending "a signal that Israel would not hesitate to use all the means at its disposal to thwart the counterdiversion scheme even at the price of a military confrontation with the Arab states."
- In the United States, Bob Pettit of the St. Louis Hawks became the first NBA player to score 20,000 points, in a 123 to 106 loss to the host Cincinnati Royals. Pettit, who was in his 11th NBA season and who had 19,993 points going into the game, made a short hook shot with 10:40 left in the second quarter, and would finish with 20,022.
- Died: Oskar Becker, 75, German mathematician and historian

== November 14, 1964 (Saturday) ==
- A former executive of Procter & Gamble, manufacturer of products that included one of America's most popular brands of toothpaste, Crest, was arrested after trying to sell a 188-page Crest marketing strategy to Procter & Gamble's top competitor in the dentifrice industry, Colgate-Palmolive, which made Colgate. From Chicago, Eugene Andrew Mayfield had called a New York executive at Colgate-Palmolive, who, in turn, contacted the FBI. Mayfield flew from Chicago to New York and, as arranged, the two sat in adjacent stalls in the men's restroom at the TWA terminal at the Kennedy Airport. "Mayfield passed over the copied document while the Colgate man passed over $20,000 in marked bills. Then Mayfield walked out into the arms of waiting FBI agents." At Mayfield's criminal trial, testimony was presented that estimated the worth of the document to be more than one million dollars.
- American anthropologist Napoleon Chagnon began his stay with the Yanomami people who would become the subject of his 1967 bestseller, The Fierce People. The Yanomami lived in Venezuela's Amazonas state (where Chagnon set up his camp) and across the Amazon River in Brazil. Chagnon's ethics would come under question years later from another anthropologist, R. Brian Ferguson of Rutgers University, who would publish a followup study, Yanomami Warfare, in 1995. "A war started between groups which had been at peace for some time on the very first day Chagnon got there", Ferguson would write, "and it continued until he left. I don't think that was an accident." In Ferguson's opinion, Chagnon had fomented warfare between the two rival groups in order to write the 1967 book.
- Born:
  - Joseph Simmons, American hip hop artist who went by the stage name "Run" when teaming up with Darryl "D.M.C." McDaniels for the group Run-D.M.C.; in Queens
  - Patrick Warburton, American actor known for voicing Joe Swanson on Family Guy and acting as David Puddy on Seinfeld; in Paterson, New Jersey

== November 15, 1964 (Sunday) ==
- General Ibrahim Abboud, who had ruled as the President of the Sudan for almost six years, resigned along with his military chiefs, the Supreme Council of the Armed Forces, after more than three weeks of protests and strikes. Abboud was temporarily replaced by his civilian Prime Minister, Sirr Al-Khatim Al-Khalifa, who would turn over power to a civilian "Sovereignty Council" until elections for a non-military government could be held in March.
- Pedro Albizu Campos, the 73-year old leader of the Puerto Rican independence movement, was given a second pardon by Puerto Rico's Governor, Luis Muñoz Marín. Albizu, still the chairman of the Puerto Rican Nationalist Party, was presented the pardon at his room in San Juan's Presbyterian Hospital, where he had been staying, under police guard, for the past eight years after suffering a stroke in 1956. Muñoz had pardoned Albizu in 1953, but the pardon had been revoked in 1954 after Puerto Rican nationalists had wounded five U.S. Congressmen in an attack on the U.S. Capitol. Albizu would die five months later, on April 21, 1965.
- Bonanza Air Lines Flight 114, a Fairchild F27 Friendship, crashed near Sloan, Nevada, while on approach to McCarran International Airport in the resort city of Paradise, in poor weather conditions, killing all 29 people on board. The event would be the only fatal accident in the 23-year history of Bonanza Air Lines.
- The People's Republic of China shot down the first of hundreds of unmanned American drone aircraft that the United States would send into Chinese airspace to monitor China's support of North Vietnam during the Vietnam War. The drone flights would continue for nearly seven years before being suspended in July 1971.

== November 16, 1964 (Monday) ==
- The Communist Party of the Soviet Union reorganized its Politburo a little more than a month after ousting Nikita Khrushchev as its leader and replacing him with Leonid Brezhnev. Frol Kozlov, who had once been viewed as Khrushchev's successor but who had been incapacitated by a stroke, was removed and former KGB Director Alexander Shelepin replaced him. Petro Shelest, the leader of the Ukrainian SSR party, was elevated from candidate membership to full membership. As a final purge of Khrushchev's legacy, his son-in-law, Alexei Adzhubei, was expelled from the Central Committee "for errors committed in his work".
- Joshua Nkomo, the leader and founder of the Zimbabwe African People's Union, was transferred from the prison in Salisbury (now Harare), along with 16 other ZAPU party members who had been detained by the white-ruled colonial government of Rhodesia, following a ruling by the southern African nation's highest court. Nkomo and his men remained imprisoned, however, and were transferred 440 miles (710 km) away to the remote Gonakudzingwa Restriction Camp. Nkomo would remain at Gonakudzingwa for the next ten years.
- British Prime Minister Wilson declared in a speech to Parliament, "If there is one nation that cannot afford to chalk on the walls 'World go home', it is Britain. We are a world power, and a world influence, or we are nothing." The statement came after Wilson had announced that the United Kingdom would phase out its military bases in the Persian Gulf and in the Pacific Ocean.
- Born:
  - Dwight Gooden, American baseball pitcher and 1985 Cy Young Award winner; in Tampa, Florida
  - Diana Krall, Canadian jazz pianist and singer; in Nanaimo, British Columbia

== November 17, 1964 (Tuesday) ==
- The New Zealand Parliament voted to approve the Constitution of the Cook Islands, to take effect on a date to be approved by the Cook Islands Legislative Council, which would then yield to a new, 24-member Parliament. The islands would become a self-governing territory "in free association with New Zealand", on August 4, 1965.
- Daisaku Ikeda founded the Kōmeitō, or "Clean Government Party", in Japan.
- Born:
  - Susan Rice, U.S. Ambassador to the United Nations from 2009 to 2013 and National Security Advisor from 2013 to 2017; in Birmingham, Alabama
  - Marina Carr, Irish playwright; in Dublin

== November 18, 1964 (Wednesday) ==
- The desegregation of restaurants, lodging and theaters in McComb, Mississippi took place "without incident" after the NAACP had selected the small town in order to test compliance with the new Civil Rights Act of 1964. A group of 20 African-American men and women were able to get served food, rent motel rooms, and sit where they wished to watch a movie. McComb Mayor Gordon Burt and local business leaders had taken out newspaper advertisements urging residents to peacefully comply with the law, and provided police officers nearby as needed; the group started with dinner at the Continental Motel restaurant across from the police station, and the only response was that "The only three white patrons got up and left as the Negroes entered." John White, who chaired the McComb City Police Committee, told reporters that the white members of the community had put pressure on businesses to change with the times, and noted that "Any time the power structure of a community takes a stand against violence, it certainly curtails the possibility of trouble."
- FBI Director J. Edgar Hoover held a rare press briefing and gave the most vicious public denouncement of civil rights leader Martin Luther King Jr. during his lifetime. Reporters of the Women's National Press Club were invited to hear Hoover's briefing called to respond to King's statements about the FBI's assignment of personnel to civil rights cases, and told the women that King— who had been awarded the Nobel Peace Prize for 1964— was "the most notorious liar in the country" and then told them to "feel free to print that".
- South Korea's President Park Chung-hee announced its list of 167 companies that the government would financially support in their efforts to increase in "light industries such as textiles, hair goods and knit wear", primarily because those were the industries "that could readily absorb surplus labor".
- The United States and the Soviet Union signed the "Agreement on Cooperation Between the Union of Soviet Socialist Republics and the United States of America in the Field of Desalination, Including the Use of Atomic Energy", was signed in Moscow.
- The Grumman C-2 Greyhound cargo airplane made its first flight.
- Born: Rita Cosby, American television journalist for Fox News, MSNBC and Newsmax, and best-selling author known for Blonde Ambition and Quiet Hero; in Brooklyn
- Died:
  - Senator Harrie Wade, 59, Australia's Health Minister and the senior member of the six Country Party members in the Australian Senate, died of a heart attack suffered while herding sheep at his farm in Horsham, Victoria.
  - Tommaso Besozzi, 61, Italian investigative reporter and author committed suicide with a homemade bomb

== November 19, 1964 (Thursday) ==
- The Neighborhood Youth Corps, one of 11 "Great Society" programs, was inaugurated to provide job training and employment for inner city youth between the ages of 16 and 21. W. Willard Wirtz, the U.S. Secretary of Labor, estimated that about 150,000 people would be enrolled in the program's first year; the actual number in 1965 would be about 38,000.
- The United States Department of Defense announced the closing of 95 military bases and facilities in 33 states and five other nations, including the Brooklyn Navy Yard, the Brooklyn Army Terminal, and Fort Jay, New York.
- Born:
  - Eric Musselman, American basketball coach for the China, U.S., Dominican Republic and Venezuela national teams between 2009 and 2013; in Ashland, Ohio
  - Nicholas Patrick, British-born American astronaut who flew on two Space Shuttle missions; in Saltburn-by-the-Sea, North Riding of Yorkshire
  - Susie Dent, English lexicographer and television celebrity; in Woking, Surrey
- Died: Little Johnny Jones, 40, African-American jazz pianist, died of lung cancer

== November 20, 1964 (Friday) ==
- The bishops at the Second Vatican Council voted overwhelmingly in favor of resolutions to reach out to Christian and non-Christian religions outside of the Roman Catholic Church, including a statement that rescinded the Church's previous position that the Jewish people were guilty for their ancestors' role in the crucifixion of Jesus Christ; the measure regarding Judaism passed by a margin of 1,770 to 185. Another resolution, which passed 1,838 to 136, stated that the Church would no longer take a total stance against non-Christian religions (such as Islam, Judaism or Buddhism). Finally, the council approved, 2,054 to 64, a commitment to ecumenism with non-Catholic Christians with efforts "by prayer, word and deed" to mend the rifts that divided the world's 900 million Christians. Pope Paul VI would promulgate the doctrine, Unitatis redintegratio, the next day.
- The crash of Linjeflyg Flight 277 killed 31 of the 43 people on board in what was the worst air disaster in Swedish history up to that time. The twin-engine Convair CV-340 struck electric power lines as it was making its approach for a landing at Ängelholm in Sweden, at the end of a 300-mile (480 km) flight from Stockholm to the Ängelholm airport. Twenty of the 39 passengers had been scheduled to disembark at Halmstad but the plane had been prevented from landing because of bad weather.
- Canada's Prime Minister Pearson announced that a previously unnamed mountain peak in the Yukon territory would be named for the late U.S. President John F. Kennedy, nearly one year after the President's assassination. The 14,000 foot (4,300 m) high Mount Kennedy is located 15 miles (24 km) away from the U.S. state of Alaska.

== November 21, 1964 (Saturday) ==
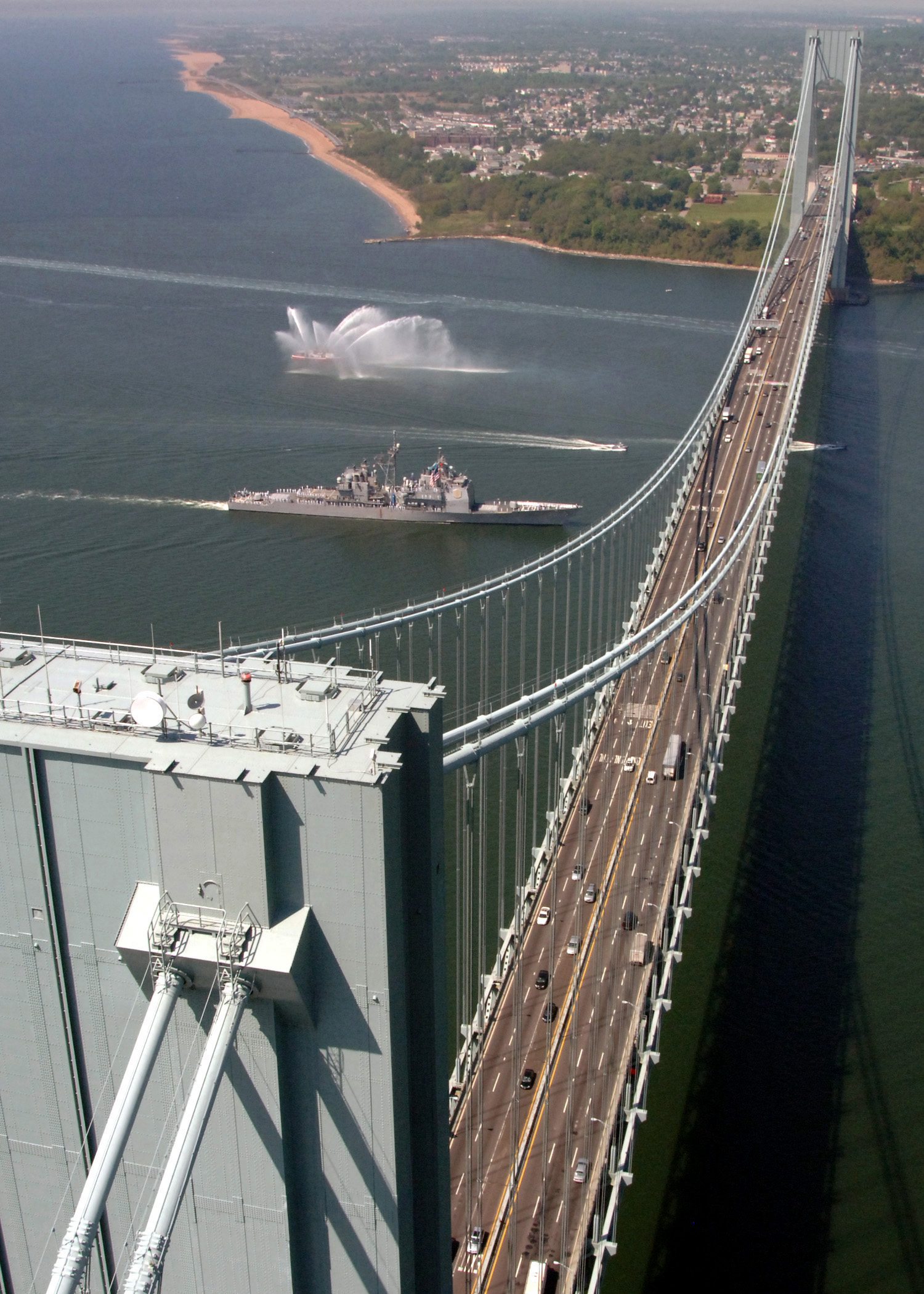
The Verrazzano–Narrows Bridge is opened

- The Verrazzano–Narrows Bridge, at 13,700 feet (4,200 m) still the longest suspension bridge in the USA, opened to traffic in New York City. Crossing over "The Narrows" between the Upper and Lower sections of the New York Bay, the bridge linked Staten Island and Brooklyn for the first time, with access at Fort Wadsworth on Staten Island and Fort Hamilton in Brooklyn. Previously, direct access between the two boroughs was on the 69th Street Ferry. In the first 24 hours of its operation, 100,000 cars crossed the bridge. The bridge itself is named for Italian explorer Giovanni da Verrazzano; the name of the bridge originally used one "z" while Verrazzano, credited as the first European (in 1524) to sail into the New York Harbor, spelled his name with two. The name however would be corrected in 2018.
- Pope Paul VI promulgated the doctrine, Unitatis redintegratio, that had been approved by the bishops of the ecumenical council the day before, as the third session of the council was brought to a close.
- Born: Shane Douglas (ring name for Troy Allan Martin), American professional wrestler; in New Brighton, Pennsylvania

== November 22, 1964 (Sunday) ==
- Golfer Jack Nicklaus narrowly defeated Arnold Palmer to become the top money winner of the year at the 1964 PGA Tour, tying for second place in the final event of the Tour, the Cajun Classic Open Invitational. Palmer had been the top money winner in 1962 and 1963, and was the leading moneymaker going into the tournament at Lafayette, Louisiana, ahead of Nicklaus by $318 ($111,703 against Nicklaus's $111,385). Although Miller Barber finished first at Lafayette (with 277 strokes for the 72 holes) to win his first PGA tournament ever, Gay Brewer missed a 15-foot putt on the 18th hole and finished at 282 instead of 281, and had to share second place with Nicklaus, who won $1,900; Palmer finished fourth, with $1,500. As a result, Nicklaus had earnings of $113,284.50 for the year, and Palmer had $113,202.37; the difference was only $81.13.
- In the little town of Schellsburg, Pennsylvania, population 288, the churchgoers "held a service of organization formalizing the union of four congregations of different denominations", marking "the first such four-way merger in the history of religion in the United States". The United Church of Schellsburg combined the members of the town's Presbyterian, Lutheran, Methodist and United Church of Christ members into one group, after a 101 to 25 vote that had been taken on October 4.
- Officials on the American side of Niagara Falls in the state of New York reported the appearance of a third separate waterfall after the falls "had been two cataracts from the beginning of recorded history". The appearance of a new island created another split in the flow of the Niagara River, which was believed to be temporary.
- The Cowra Japanese War Cemetery was dedicated in Cowra, New South Wales as a final resting place for the remains of 523 Japanese soldiers and sailors who died in Australia during World War II, and as a memorial to 231 Japanese men killed in the "Cowra breakout" from the prisoner of war camp located there.

== November 23, 1964 (Monday) ==
- The crash of TWA Flight 800 killed 50 of the 73 people aboard as the pilot aborted takeoff from Rome toward Athens. Much of the accident, at 2:05 in the afternoon, was avoidable. Construction was in progress on runway 25 at Rome's Leonardo Da Vinci International Airport, shortening the available length for takeoff and landing 8,600 feet (2,600 m) to 6,500 feet (2,000 m). In addition, a steamroller was working only 100 feet (30 m) from the runway. One of the Boeing 707's four engines failed. The jet could not be controlled and it clipped the steamroller, then burst into flame. Escape chutes were brought out after a delay and only 23 people survived after getting out; 45 passengers and 5 of the 11-member crew died of carbon monoxide poisoning. TWA would continue to use the "Flight 800" designation; on July 17, 1996, another TWA Flight 800 would be the call sign for a Boeing 747 that crashed into the ocean after taking off from New York for Paris.
- The U.S. Supreme Court declined to review, and let stand, a lower court ruling that rejected a change in the Pledge of Allegiance to the Flag of the United States, specifically taking back out the phrase "under God" from the pledge that schoolchildren were required to recite at the beginning of the day. Courts in the state of New York had rejected a suit premised on the idea that the reference to God was a violation of the First Amendment guarantees of the separation of church and state in the United States.
- Swiss and German authorities reached an agreement to exchange the village of Verenahof to Switzerland for an equal amount of Swiss land, as well as settling other border disputes in the area.
- Died: Edward Celestin Daly, 43, American cleric and Roman Catholic Bishop of Des Moines, Iowa, was among the victims of the TWA plane crash in Rome. Daly had been attending the Second Vatican Council and was returning home by way of Athens.

== November 24, 1964 (Tuesday) ==
- Belgian paratroopers and mercenaries captured Stanleyville in a rescue mission to liberate 3,000 foreigners who had been taken hostage by Congolese rebels. Although most were saved, at least 120 hostages "died in the period before the rescue, during the rescue itself, and in massacres in the countryside that followed". In the first week after the city was retaken, government forces would begin the process of executing 300 suspected rebels. According to witness reports released in January, suspects were led into Patrice Lumumba Stadium and displayed in front of spectators; "If the spectators cheered or clapped, the suspect was released. If they booed, he was condemned to death." Over 500 condemned people were killed by sub-machine guns after being driven to the countryside.
- The United National Liberation Front, a separatist group in India, was formed in the Union Territory of Manipur to carry out a war against the national government.
- Australia's parliament passed the National Service Act 1964, restoring the draft of 20-year-old men into the Army, with a system of selection based on birthday.

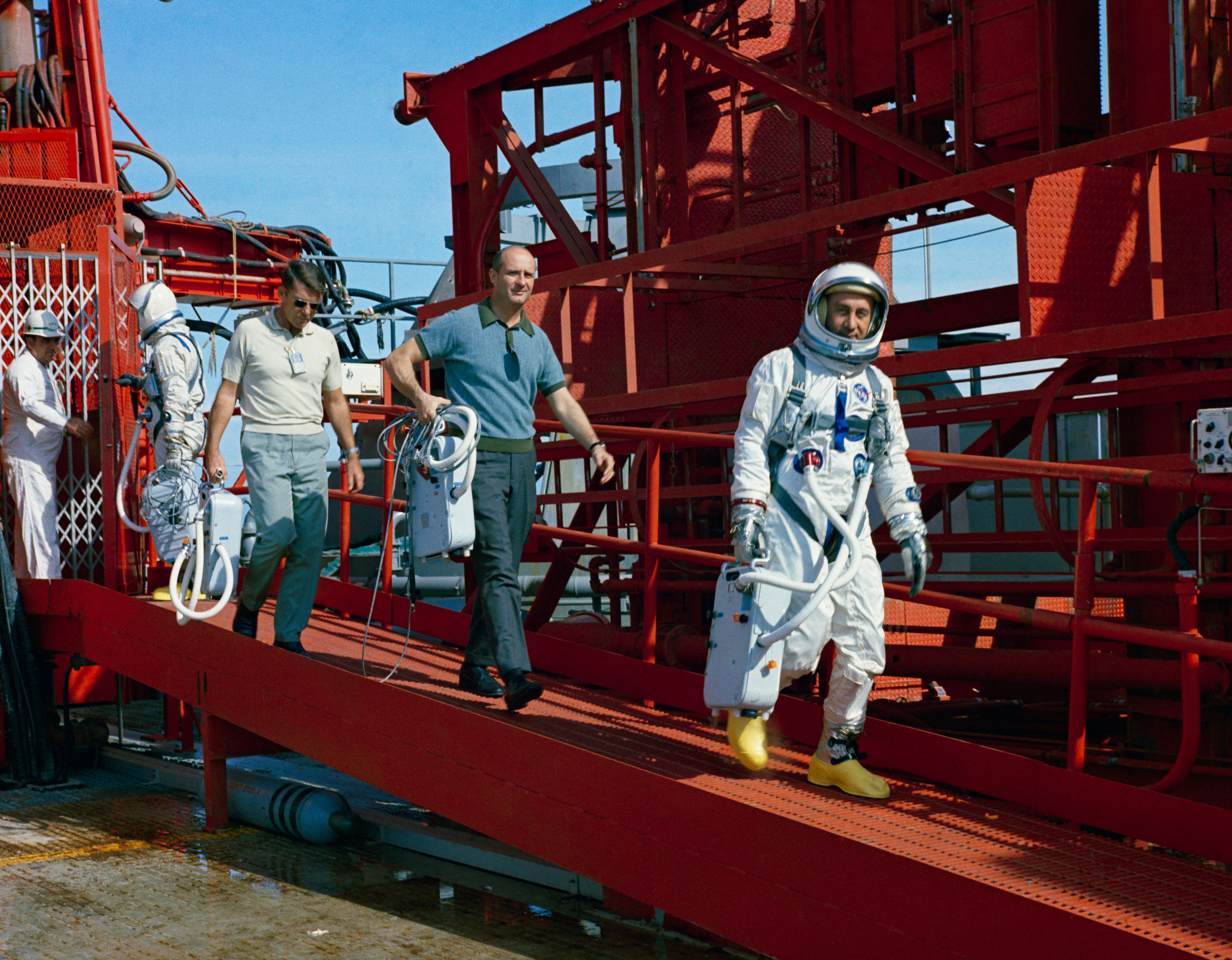
November 24, 1964: Gemini 3 prime (in spacesuits) and backup crewmembers during egress training

- Gemini 2 successfully completed the Wet Mock Simulated Launch, a full-scale countdown exercise which included propellant loading. Procedures for flight crew suiting and spacecraft ingress were practiced during simulated launch. The primary Gemini 3 flight crew donned the training suits and full biomedical instrumentation.
- Born: Alistair McGowan, British comedian and impressionist; in Evesham, Worcestershire
- Died:
  - Glen Sabre Valance, 21, Australian criminal and the last person to be executed in the state of South Australia, was hanged at the Adelaide Gaol at Thebarton, after being convicted of the June 16 murder of his boss, Richard Strang.
  - Dr. Paul Carlson, 36, American physician and missionary of the Evangelical Covenant Church, was killed during the attempt to rescue him from Congolese rebels in Stanleyville.

== November 25, 1964 (Wednesday) ==
- The Niger River Commission (now called the Niger Basin Authority) was formed by an agreement signed in Niamey, the capital of Niger, and was inspired by the Tennessee Valley Authority in the United States. Parties to the agreement were the West African nations served by the Niger River and its tributaries— Guinea, Mali, the Ivory Coast (now Côte d'Ivoire), Upper Volta (now Burkina Faso), Dahomey (now Benin), Niger, Nigeria and Cameroon.
- Six weeks after exploding its first nuclear weapon, the People's Republic of China proposed a "no first use" agreement with the United States of America. At the time, the two superpowers had no diplomatic relations, so discussions took place in Warsaw between the two nations' ambassadors to Poland, with John M. Cabot representing the U.S. and Wang Guoquan making the proposal on behalf of China.
- Paul Hulme, the Postmaster-General of Australia, announced a new design for the nation's 1,500 telephone booths, which he said would be "flat-roofed, made from aluminum and glass" with "a distinctive sign on the roof so that they can be seen from a distance" and "lit continuously inside by a fluorescent strip so that people will have enough light at all times to read directories."
- Robert Lee Johnson, a former U.S. Army sergeant who had been spying for the Soviet Union since 1953, surrendered himself to the FBI at the police station in Reno, Nevada. He would confess to treason and be given a 25-year sentence in 1965, serving seven years at the Lewisburg Federal Penitentiary in Pennsylvania before being stabbed to death by his son during a visit.
- Born: Mark Lanegan, American singer-songwriter and musician; in Ellensburg, Washington (d. 2022)
- Died:
  - Clarence Kolb, 90, American vaudeville performer for the duo Kolb and Dill, who later appeared as a character actor in film and television
  - Dwaram Venkataswamy Naidu, 71, Indian carnatic music violinist

== November 26, 1964 (Thursday) ==
- The sinking of MV Stolt Dagali killed 19 of its 43 crew members, after the Norwegian tanker was cut in half by the Israeli cruise ship SS Shalom off the coast of the United States. Stolt Dagali was carrying "a cargo of solvents and vegetable oils" from Philadelphia to New York City to pick up more cargo. Shalom had departed from New York with 616 passengers on their way to the West Indies. At 2:15, as the ships proceeded through a heavy fog, the faster Shalom cut "directly through the tanker's hull, splitting her neatly in two". The stern of the Stolt Dagali sank immediately with all on board; the forward two-thirds of the tanker stayed afloat and the U.S. Coast Guard and the Shalom rescued 24 survivors from the icy waters of the Atlantic Ocean.
- An angry mob in Cairo set fire to the United States Information Agency library in the Egyptian capital as a protest against American support for the Congo rescue. The city's fire department was slow in responding and the library's 24,000 book collection was destroyed along with the furniture and equipment.
- Television was introduced to Pakistan as the Pakistan Television Corporation (PTV) went on the air in the city of Lahore.
- Born:
  - Vreni Schneider, Swiss ski racer and winner of gold medals in the women's slalom competition in 1988 and 1994; in Elm, Switzerland
  - Tom Cable, American football coach; head coach of the Oakland Raiders from 2008 to 2010; in Merced, California

== November 27, 1964 (Friday) ==
- Lhendup Dorji, who had been the acting Prime Minister of Bhutan after being appointed on July 25 (following the April 5 assassination of Jigme Palden Dorji), was dismissed by King Jigme Singye Wangchuck. No new Prime Minister was appointed for the Himalayan mountain kingdom, and the king would appoint a Royal Advisory Council to serve the function of administering the government.
- One of U.S. President Johnson's pet dogs, named "Her", died during surgery at the Walter Reed Army Medical Center after apparently "swallowing a stone on the White House grounds". The pet beagle had become famous after Johnson had lifted her by her ears for photographers.
- Born: Robin Givens, American television actress known for Head of the Class, as well as being an activist against domestic violence after having a troubled marriage with boxer Mike Tyson; in New York City

== November 28, 1964 (Saturday) ==
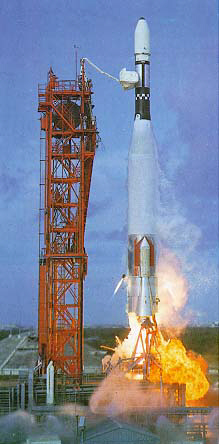
November 28, 1964: Mariner 4 launched

- NASA launched the Mariner 4 space probe from Cape Kennedy at 8:22 in the morning, three weeks after the failure of Mariner 3. Traveling at 8,300 miles per hour (13,400 km/h), the fourth Mariner started off toward Mars on a seven-month journey. On its original trajectory, the probe would have missed the Red Planet by 150,000 miles (240,000 km), but a correction was made on December 5. Mariner 4 would make its closest approach (within 6,118 miles (9,846 km) of Mars) and return television pictures on July 15, 1965.
- On the last day of scheduled games during the 1964 NCAA University Division football season, the #1-ranked Notre Dame Fighting Irish blew a 17–0 halftime lead against the USC Trojans at Los Angeles, and lost the game, 20–17. With that loss, the #2-ranked Alabama Crimson Tide (which had closed its season at 10–0–0 with its win over Auburn two days earlier) was voted the #1 ranking by both the Associated Press poll of sportswriters and the United Press International poll of coaches to be recognized by the NCAA as the unofficial college football champion for 1964. At the time, no polling was taken after the postseason bowl games. Alabama would lose in the Orange Bowl to Texas, while the nation's other major unbeaten and untied team, the #2 ranked Arkansas Razorbacks, would win the Cotton Bowl over Nebraska. Since no further polls were taken, however, Arkansas would remain at second place despite its 11–0–0 record.
- In West Germany, extreme right-wing members of the Deutsche Reichspartei, the Gesamtdeutsche Partei and the Deutsche Partei founded the Nationaldemokratische Partei Deutschlands (NPD), the National Democratic Party of Germany. A former Nazi Party member, Adolf von Thadden, guided the NPD, but Fritz Thielen, a co-founder of the Christian Democratic Union (CDU), was installed as the NPD's first Chairman in order "to create the appearance of being a national- conservative party with a leadership without a Nazi past."
- Tommy Ross, a soccer football striker for Ross County F.C. in the lower level Highland Football League of Scotland, set a record for the fastest hat-trick (three goals in a match). In the game against Nairn County F.C., Ross made three goals in 90 seconds.
- Süleyman Demirel was elected as the new leader of the Adalet Partisi, the Justice Party of Turkey. A year later, he would become Prime Minister with the Justice Party's win in the October 10 general election.
- Died: Charles Meredith, 70, American silent film star and stage actor

== November 29, 1964 (Sunday) ==
- On the first Sunday of Advent in the Roman Catholic Church, Catholics "walked into their parishes around the globe and, for the first time since the fall of the Roman Empire, participated in a mass that was given largely in their native tongue." From the founding of the Catholic church up until 1964, the mass had always been conducted in Latin, until a reform by the Second Vatican Council.
- A group of Congo's Simba rebels shot down a chartered Belgian DC-4 airplane as it was taking off from the Stanleyville airport following the recapture of the city, killing 44 of the 51 people on board, most of them Congolese National Army soldiers.
- White mercenaries and Congolese troops rescued more than 100 Belgian civilians after driving the Simba rebels out of the village of Dingila.
- A panic at a political rally in the Mexican city of Jalapa, killed 24 people who were trampled to death, while 37 more were injured. A crowd of 5,000 assembled in an arena to watch Veracruz state Governor Fernando Lopez Arias. In the excitement to attend a festival at a nearby park, the crowd proceeded down one of the stairways toward the exit when a woman fell, and those further up the stairs began falling as well.
- A different group of rebels entered the village of Bafwabaka and kidnapped all 46 nuns in a Roman Catholic convent, the Sisters of the Holy Family, operated by Marie-Clémentine Anuarite Nengapeta. Nengapeta, who would be beatified in 1985, would be murdered on December 1.
- Born: Don Cheadle, American stage, film and TV actor, known for The Fresh Prince of Bel-Air, Iron Man 2, and the Broadway musical A Strange Loop; in Kansas City, Missouri
- Died: Anne de Vries, 60, Dutch novelist

== November 30, 1964 (Monday) ==
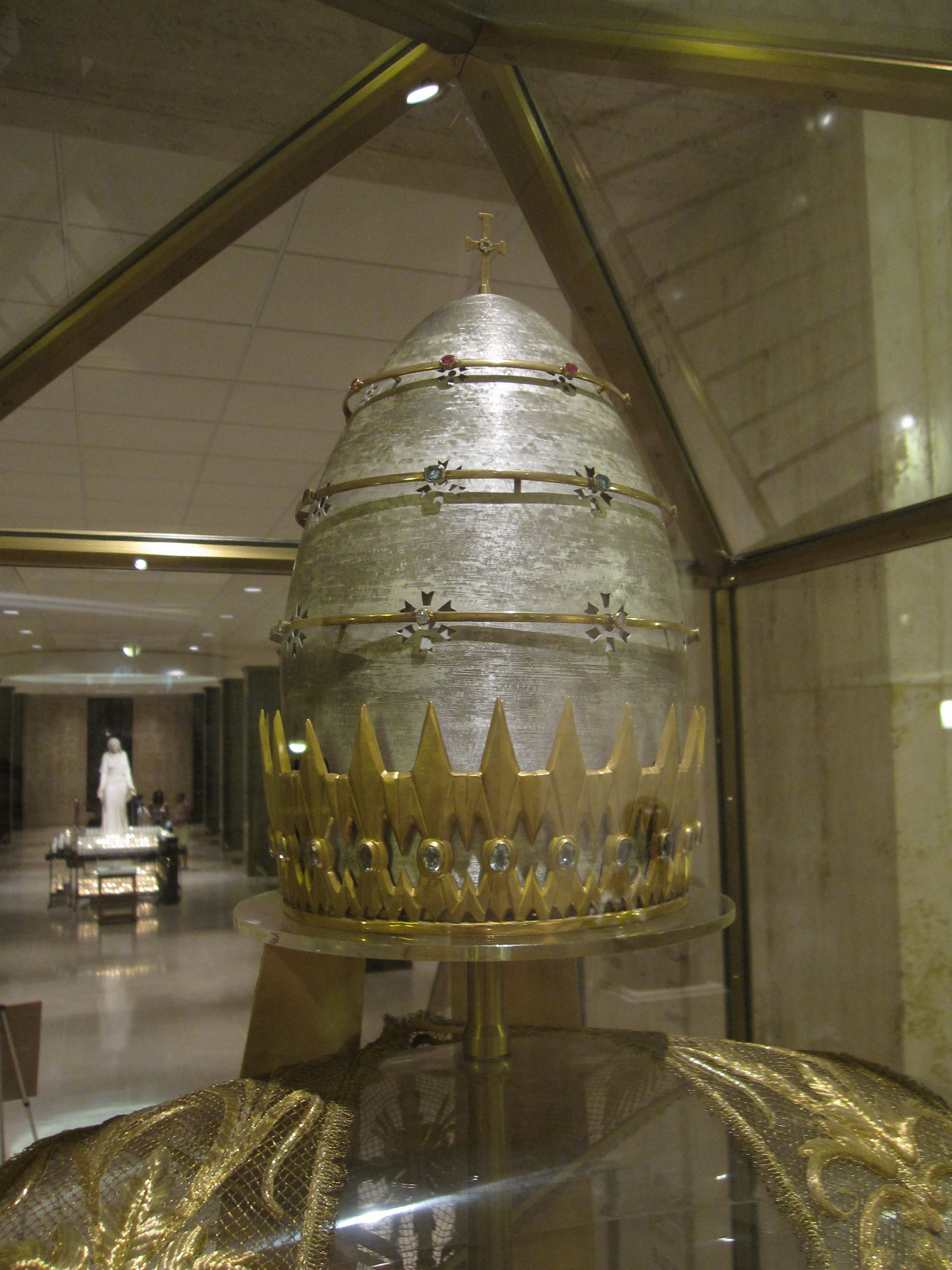
The tiara

- Pope Paul VI gave his gold, silver and bejeweled papal tiara to the United States for permanent display, "in gratitude for all that Americans have done for the poor of the world". Cardinal Francis Spellman, the Roman Catholic Archbishop of New York, announced the gift and displayed the crown in a meeting with fellow clergymen at a hotel in New York City.
- Zond 2, the Soviet Union's probe set to make a flyby of the planet Mars, was launched two days after the United States had sent Mariner 4. Although Zond 2 would pass within 1,500 kilometres (930 miles) of Mars on August 6, 1965, far closer than the Mariner 4 probe, the Zond would be unable to transmit images because of damage to one of its solar panels.
- Astronauts James McDivitt and Edward White, command pilot and pilot for the Gemini-Titan 4 mission, began crew training on Gemini mission simulator No. 2 in Houston. The initial week of training was devoted to familiarizing the crew with the interior of the spacecraft.
- Sir Winston Churchill celebrated his 90th and last birthday. The day before the celebration, hundreds of well-wishers stood outside his Hyde Park home in London and sang "Happy Birthday to You" and "For He's a Jolly Good Fellow".
