= December 1964 =

Month of 1964

<<	December 1964					>>
Su	Mo	Tu	We	Th	Fr	Sa
		1	2	3	4	5
6	7	8	9	10	11	12
13	14	15	16	17	18	19
20	21	22	23	24	25	26
27	28	29	30	31

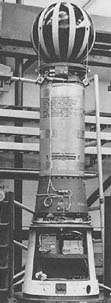
December 15, 1964: San Marco 1, first Italian satellite, launched from U.S.

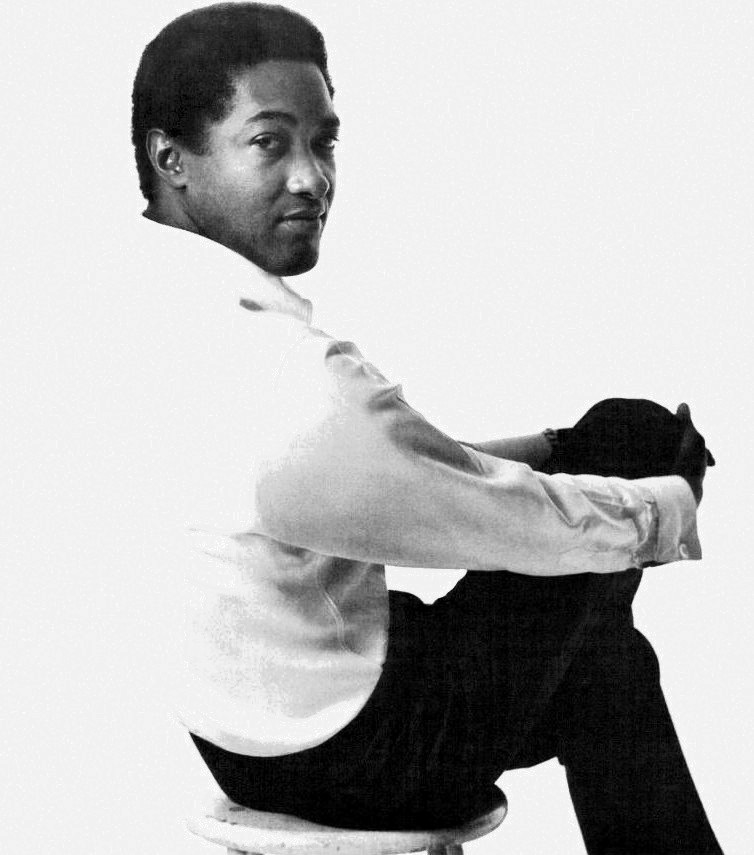
December 11, 1964: Singer Sam Cooke shot in altercation

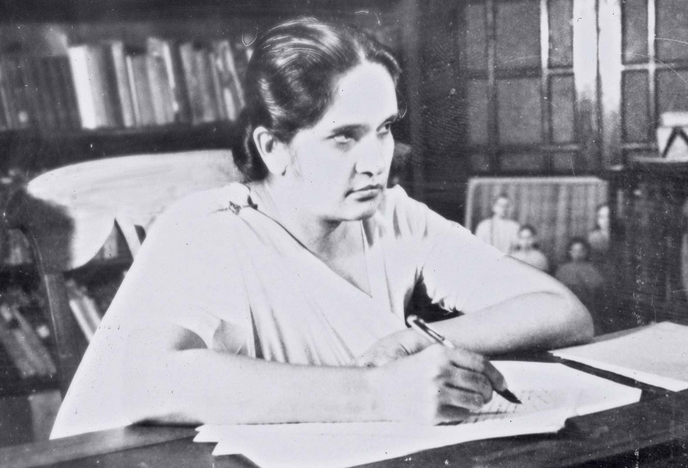
December 3, 1964: Government of Ceylon's Bandaranaike toppled by 74 to 73 vote

The following events occurred in December 1964:

== December 1, 1964 (Tuesday) ==
- The Supreme Court of the Soviet Union announced a change in the nation's historic presumption of guilt in criminal proceedings, in favor of the presumption of innocence, often described as "innocent until proven guilty". Justice Alexander Gorkin, the President of the Supreme Court and the USSR's highest judicial officer, gave notice in the government newspaper Izvestia of the new criminal procedure, and added that the practice of summary secret police trials, common during the era of Joseph Stalin, was over.
- Civil rights movement leader Martin Luther King Jr. and FBI Director J. Edgar Hoover met for 70 minutes at FBI headquarters in Washington, D.C., in order to clear up the animosity between the two men. King had said that the FBI had done a poor job of investigating civil rights violations in the South, and Hoover had called King "the most notorious liar in the country", and the two met at King's request.
- The Ankara Agreement, signed on September 12, 1963, between representatives of Turkey and the European Economic Community (EEC), went into effect, beginning the preparatory stage for Turkey's eventual full membership in the EEC. More than fifty years later, Turkey maintains a relationship with the EEC's successor, the European Union, but has not attained membership.
- U.S. President Lyndon B. Johnson and his top-ranking advisers met to discuss plans to bomb North Vietnam. After some debate, they agreed on a two-phase bombing plan with an objective of ending North Vietnamese support of Viet Cong operations in South Vietnam and maintaining the security of other non-Communist nations in Southeast Asia.
- Alex Quaison-Sackey of Ghana was elected to a one-year term as President of the United Nations General Assembly, becoming the first black African to hold the post and, at age 40, the youngest. In 1961, Mongi Slim of Tunisia had been the first from an African nation.
- Gustavo Díaz Ordaz took office for a six-year term as the 49th president of Mexico, succeeding Adolfo López Mateos. Díaz Ordaz would serve until December 1, 1970.
- Joseph F. Shea, NASA's Apollo Spacecraft Program Manager, proposed what would become the Apollo Applications Program, for use of technology developed for Apollo to be used after the achievement of the primary goal of landing on the Moon. The proposal came in a letter to Apollo Program Director Samuel C. Phillips regarding tentative spacecraft development and mission planning schedules, touched upon missions following completion of Apollo's prime goal of Such missions, Shea said, would in general fall under the heading of a new program (such as Apollo X).
- Died:
  - Marie-Clémentine Anuarite Nengapeta, 24, Congolese Roman Catholic nun, was murdered by the Simba rebels in the Congo; she would be beatified by the Roman Catholic Church in 1965.
  - J. B. S. Haldane, 72, British geneticist

== December 2, 1964 (Wednesday) ==
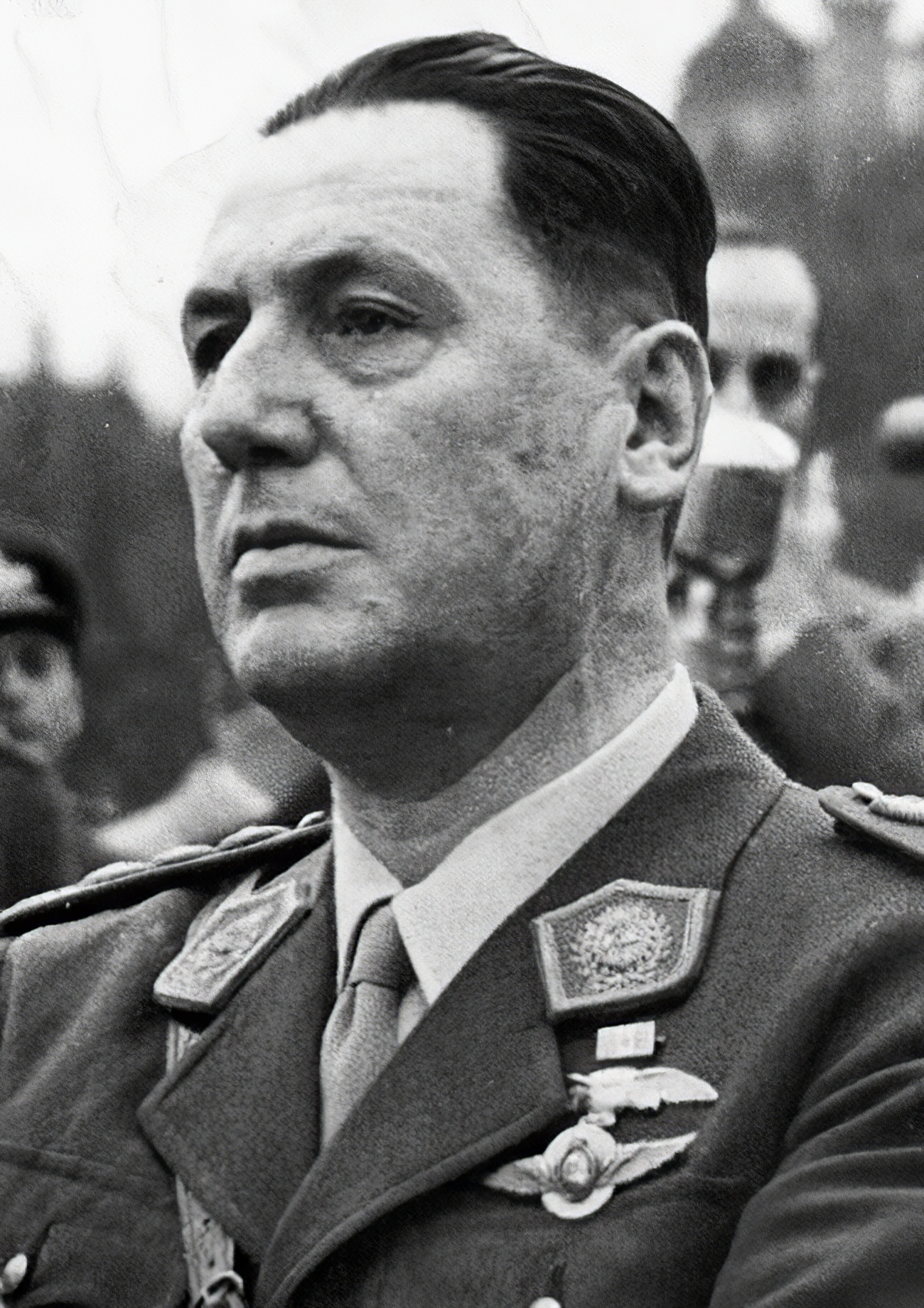
Perón

- Juan Perón, the former President of Argentina who had been overthrown in 1955, attempted to secretly return from exile in Spain and to take power again as the Argentine dictator. When his flight from Madrid stopped in Brazil at Rio de Janeiro, Brazilian authorities boarded the aircraft and ordered Perón to disembark. Argentine union leader Augusto Vandor, who had organized "Operation Return" and had accompanied Perón on the flight from Spain, was allowed to continue to Argentina. Perón, however, was sent back on the Iberia DC-8 jet on its return flight from Rio to Madrid. Peron's Iberia Airlines flight had been scheduled to land in Montevideo in Uruguay, where Peron had planned to travel by land to Paraguay and then back to Argentina. Peron would finally return to Argentina in 1973 and would serve as President until his death in 1974.
- Mario Savio addressed a crowd of 5,000 students at the University of California, Berkeley, delivering what would be a famous speech now known as the "Bodies Upon the Gears" speech, guiding them to occupy the university's administration building, Sproul Hall. More than 1,000 walked into the building to begin a sit-in; UC officials estimated that 814 of the occupiers were arrested and "that most of those who sat in and were jailed were students." "There is a time," Savio said, "when the operation of the machine becomes so odious, makes you so sick at heart that you can't take part; and you've got to put your bodies upon the gears and upon the wheels, upon all the apparatus, and you've got to make it stop. And you've got to indicate to the people who own it, that unless you're free, the machine will be prevented from working at all." The Free Speech Movement would expand from Berkeley to other university and college campuses in America and beyond.

== December 3, 1964 (Thursday) ==
- Owners of the 20 National League and American League baseball teams voted to create the Major League Baseball draft in order to make a more uniform distribution of amateur players. In an imitation of the drafting process in other professional sports leagues, the teams would select "in reverse order off the standings at the end of the previous season". Though the proposal was initially opposed by both New York teams (the Yankees and Mets), both Los Angeles teams (the Dodgers and Angels), the St. Louis Cardinals, the Minnesota Twins, and the Washington Senators, the resolution passed unanimously. The teams would have the first option, for a limited time, to negotiate exclusively with the players selected. The first draft would be held on June 8, 1965.
- Sirimavo Bandaranaike lost a vote of confidence as Prime Minister of Ceylon by a single vote, as 14 members of parliament from her Sri Lanka Freedom Party went against her. The final result on the resolution that the House of Representatives had lost confidence in her government was 74 for, 73 against. The immediate cause had been her decision to form a coalition government with the Lanka Sama Samaja Party and to nationalize opposition newspapers. New elections would be held in March, and opposition leader Dudley Senanayake would form a new government with his United National Party.
- Canadian murderer George Marcotte, who had dressed as Santa Claus to hold up a bank in the Montreal suburb of St. Laurent, Quebec, and killed two policemen responding to the alarm, had his death sentence commuted 12 hours before he was scheduled to be hanged. The decision was made by a vote of the cabinet of Prime Minister Lester Pearson at the request of Justice Minister Guy Favreau.
- Police arrested 814 students at the University of California, Berkeley, following their takeover of and massive sit-in at the Sproul Hall administration building. The sit-in most directly protested the U.C. Regents' decision to punish student activists for what many thought had been justified civil disobedience earlier in the conflict.
- NASA ended further flight testing in the Paraglider Landing System Program, following completion of full-scale test vehicle flight test No. 25. NASA authorized North American to use the test vehicles and equipment it had for a contractor-supported flight test program, and North American conducted a two-week test program which culminated in a successful crewed tow-test vehicle flight on December 19.
- A fire which broke out at about 4 a.m. almost completely destroyed the D. Maria II National Theatre in Lisbon, Portugal. Only the theater's facade and exterior walls remained intact. A production of William Shakespeare's Macbeth was playing at the theater at the time. The rebuilt theater would reopen in 1978.
- The Danish football club Brøndby IF was founded as a merger between the two local clubs Brøndbyøster Idrætsforening and Brøndbyvester Idrætsforening. The club would win the national championship in the Danish Superliga 10 times, and the national Danish Cup six times.
- Died: U.S. Navy Admiral Charles P. Snyder, 85, the first Naval Inspector General

== December 4, 1964 (Friday) ==
- FBI agents arrested 19 men in and around Neshoba County, Mississippi on federal indictments arising from the June 21 kidnapping and murder of Andrew Goodman, Michael Schwerner and James Chaney. An author would note later, "The accused, including truck drivers, farmers, cops, and the owner of the burial site, were taken from cafes, farmhouses, and trailers." Two of the most prominent defendants, Neshoba County Sheriff Lawrence A. Rainey and Deputy Sheriff Cecil Price had returned from a raid on a moonshine still to the courthouse in Philadelphia, Mississippi, to find agents waiting for them. Most were freed the same day when friends posted bonds of $5,000 apiece for them. Six days later, a U.S. trial commissioner in Meridian voided the arrest warrants on 19 of the 21 defendants pending a hearing for whether there was probable cause for continuing charges.
- Beatles for Sale, the fourth studio album by The Beatles, was released in the United Kingdom on the Parlophone label, and included the single "Eight Days a Week". Songs from the 34-minute British album would be on two American extended play albums, Beatles '65 and Beatles VI.
- Born:
  - Christopher B. Duncan, American actor best known for his roles on The Jamie Foxx Show, The First Family, and Veronica Mars; in Lincoln, Nebraska
  - Marisa Tomei, American actress and winner of an Academy Award for Best Actress for My Cousin Vinny; in Brooklyn, New York
  - Sertab Erener, Turkish pop music singer; in Istanbul
- Died: Pina Pellicer, 30, Mexican film and television actress known for playing the female lead opposite Marlon Brando in One-Eyed Jacks, and as co-star with Ignacio López Tarso in the classic Mexican film Macario, committed suicide.

== December 5, 1964 (Saturday) ==
- An American LGM-30B Minuteman I missile was on strategic alert at Launch Facility (LF) L-02 at Ellsworth Air Force Base, South Dakota, when two airmen were dispatched to repair the inner zone security system. In the midst of their checkout of that system, one retrorocket in the spacer below the Reentry Vehicle fired, causing the missile to fall about 75 feet (23 m) to the floor of the silo. When the missile struck bottom, the arming and fusing/altitude control subsystem containing the batteries were torn loose, thus removing all sources of power from the missile, which structure received considerable damage. All safety devices operated properly in that they did not sense the proper sequence of events to allow arming the warhead. There was no detonation or radioactive contamination.
- Pope Paul VI returned to Vatican City after a four-day pilgrimage to India, but not before two Turkish Air Force fighters flew dangerously close to the DC-8 airliner that was carrying him. When the Alitalia flight from Bombay to Rome crossed into the airspace of Turkey at 33,000 feet (10,000 m), an escort of four planes joined alongside for 25 minutes in what was intended as a show of respect, before responding to a request by the Alitalia pilot to move away. Two of the planes "flew less than a wing length away", a claim confirmed by a photograph taken by one of the DC-8 passengers.
- Controllers at the Jet Propulsion Laboratory in Pasadena, California, successfully corrected the trajectory of Mariner 4 by the timed firing of retrorockets to send the probe toward the planet Mars. The course correction was implemented after it was calculated that the Mariner probe's heading would have caused it to miss Mars by more than 150,000 miles (240,000 km); the new heading was calculated to bring the probe within 5,400 miles (8,700 km).
- The National Academy of Sciences founded the National Academy of Engineering in the United States, with the approval by the NAS of the new academy's Articles of Organization.

== December 6, 1964 (Sunday) ==
- The one-hour stop-motion animated special Rudolph the Red-Nosed Reindeer, based on the popular Christmas song, was broadcast for the first time, on NBC. Filmed by Rankin/Bass Productions, and narrated by Burl Ives, the show was sponsored originally by General Electric and was telecast at 5:30 p.m. Eastern Time. It became a Christmas tradition in the United States, still being shown on television more than 50 years later. Associated Press TV critic Cynthia Lowry praised the show as "a program of sheer delight for young and old". Another critic, however, commented that "efforts to 'modernize' Christmas with such insipid treacle as last night's 'Rudolph the Red-Nosed Reindeer' presentation should be resisted in the streets, the alleys and on the beaches."
- Rioting that would eventually kill 250 people began in Khartoum, the capital of the Sudan, between the predominantly black South Sudanese minority and the white Arab northern Sudan residents. The triggering incident was a false rumor of the death of the highest-ranked black African cabinet member in Prime Minister al-Sirr's cabinet, Interior Minister Clement Mboro. A crowd of wellwishers had gone to the Khartoum Airport to welcome Mboro back from a tour of the south Sudan, and the airplane did not show up at the scheduled time. Word spread that Mboro had been murdered and, after hours had passed, angry southerners attack Khartoum's northerners, and crowds of northerners retaliated.
- Antonio Segni resigned as President of Italy slightly more than halfway through his seven-year term, after suffering a stroke in August. Cesare Merzagora, leader of the Italian Senate, was sworn in as acting president until parliament could elect a successor to Segni.
- Died: Consuelo Vanderbilt, 87, American-born Duchess of Marlborough

== December 7, 1964 (Monday) ==
- The United States Supreme Court struck down, as unconstitutional, a Florida law that prohibited cohabitation between a white man and a black woman, or a black man and a white woman, noting that Florida did not prohibit cohabitation between persons of the same race. The case of McLaughlin v. Florida arose when Dewey McLaughlin, a black man, and Connie Hoffman, a white woman, had been sentenced to 30 days in jail after living together in Miami. The Court avoided commenting on state laws prohibiting interracial marriage.
- NASA began a four-day "comfort test" of the Gemini space suit as part of its suit qualification test program. An unidentified human volunteer used Gemini food and bioinstrumentation, as well as testing the Gemini "waste management systems hardware" within the suit.
- In a letter to President Lyndon B. Johnson, Senator Clinton P. Anderson, Chairman of the U.S. Senate Committee on Aeronautical and Space Sciences, recommended merging the Air Force's Manned Orbiting Laboratory (MOL) and NASA's Apollo X programs be merged in order to most effectively use the nation's available resources. Senator Anderson claimed that one billion dollars could be saved during the next five years if the MOL were canceled and the funds applied to NASA's Apollo-based space station program. Later, Anderson would announce that the U.S. Department of Defense and NASA had worked out an agreement on MOL and Apollo X and that "The Air Force and NASA will take advantage of each other's technology and hardware development, with all efforts directed at achievement of a true space laboratory as an end goal."
- Born:
  - Roberta Close, Brazilian transgender fashion model; in Rio de Janeiro
  - Peter Laviolette, American NHL coach; in Franklin, Massachusetts

== December 8, 1964 (Tuesday) ==
- One person was killed and four B43 nuclear bombs and a warhead were knocked to the ground at Bunker Hill Air Force Base near Kokomo, Indiana. A U.S. Air Force B-58 Hustler was blown off the runway by the exhaust of another B-58. Radioactive contamination was limited to the crash site. The plane's navigator was killed in a failed ejection, but two other crew members escaped.
- UDEAC (Union Douanière et Économique de l’Afrique Centrale), the Customs and Economic Union of Central Africa, was established by the Brazzaville Treaty, signed in the capital of the Republic of Congo by representatives of that nation, as well as Cameroon, the Central African Republic, Chad, and Gabon.
- The Berkeley Division of the University of California Academic Senate voted, 824 to 115, in favor of a resolution calling on UC-Berkeley to halt all regulation of speech on campus and of its content, following the sit-in and arrest by Free Speech Movement protesters.
- Professional football player Fred Arbanas of the Kansas City Chiefs was permanently blinded in his left eye after being attacked by a mugger late in the 1964 season. Nevertheless, he returned to play six more seasons in the American Football League.
- Born: Teri Hatcher, American TV actress known as the lead star of Desperate Housewives, and the co-star of Lois & Clark: The New Adventures of Superman; in Palo Alto, California

== December 9, 1964 (Wednesday) ==
- The Convention on Consent to Marriage, Minimum Age for Marriage and Registration of Marriages entered into force after being signed on November 7, 1962. As of 2024, 55 nations parties to the Convention, which provides for marriages to be registered in order to be binding, and for marriage to require the consent of both parties. The international convention does not set a uniform minimum age for parties to be wed; among participating nations, the age for marriage for consenting partners ranges from 15 (for males and females in Yemen) to 21.
- John Coltrane's seminal album A Love Supreme was recorded in Englewood Cliffs, New Jersey.
- Born:
  - Hape Kerkeling (Hans Peter Kerkeling), German comedian; in Recklinghausen, West Germany
  - Johannes B. Kerner, German sportscaster; in Bonn, West Germany
  - Larry Emdur, Australian game show host; in Melbourne
- Died: Edith Sitwell, 77, English poet

== December 10, 1964 (Thursday) ==
- Martin Luther King Jr. was presented the Nobel Peace Prize in Oslo for his work in the American civil rights movement. Dr. King commented, "I must ask why this prize is awarded to a movement... which has not won the very peace and brotherhood which is the essence of the Nobel Prize. I conclude that this award, which I receive on behalf of that movement is profound recognition that nonviolence is the answer to the crucial political and moral question of our time— the need for man to overcome oppression and violence without resorting to violence and oppression."
- The Japanese fishing trawler Uji Maru, owned by Japan Marine Products Company, disappeared with 33 crewmen aboard. The 535-tonne (527-long-ton; 590-short-ton) ship had been in the south Atlantic Ocean off the coast of Angola when it had last sent a radio message. Its wreckage would be found two weeks later in 280-foot (85 m) deep waters.
- Born:
  - Edith González, Mexican television soap opera actress; in Monterrey (died of ovarian cancer, 2019)
  - Bobby Flay, American celebrity chef and restaurateur; in New York City
- Died: Mariano Rossell y Arellano, 70, Roman Catholic Archbishop of Guatemala

== December 11, 1964 (Friday) ==
- Che Guevara addressed the U.N. General Assembly. Guevara, a guerrilla leader in the Cuban Revolution, was serving at the time as the Minister for Industry in Cuba as part of the cabinet of Fidel Castro. Guevara charged that the United States was a warmonger and said that there had been 1,323 provocations by the U.S. along the boundary between the Guantanamo Naval Base and the rest of Cuba. "A gigantic flock of 200 million Latin Americans is giving a warning note to the Yankee imperialists," Guevara said. "The hour of vindication is being pointed to with precision."
- During Guevara's address, an anti-tank rocket was fired at the United Nations Headquarters in New York City by a person holding a bazooka. Police found the weapon on a street in Queens, "mounted beneath a Cuban flag", and apparently fired by a Cuban exile. The shell fell 100 yards (91 m) from the UN Building and landed in the East River, where it exploded.
- Langley Research Center (LaRC) announced award of a 10-month contract to The Boeing Company to study the feasibility of designing and launching a crewed orbital telescope and to investigate ways in which such an astronomical observatory might be operated, particularly the role that humans might play in scientific observations. The study presumed that the telescope would be operated in conjunction with the proposed Manned Orbital Research Laboratory being investigated by Langley.
- Born: Ayelet Waldman, Israeli-born American lawyer and mystery novelist; in Jerusalem
- Died:
  - Sam Cooke, 33, African-American singer and songwriter known for such songs as "You Send Me", was shot dead by the manager of the Hacienda Motel in Los Angeles, located at 9137 South Figueroa Street. Bertha Lee Franklin, who was also African-American, told police that Cooke had kicked in the door to her office and struck her with his fist, and accused her of hiding a prostitute who had been registered at the motel with him. Mrs. Franklin said she pulled a pistol from her desk and fired three shots at Cooke, one of which struck him in the chest; the young woman told police that Cooke had forced her to his room and attempted to rape her. A coroner's jury would later conclude that the death was justifiable homicide. Cooke's funeral was held at the Mount Sinai Baptist Church in Los Angeles, "where a crowd of 5,000 packed a 1,500-capacity sanctuary for an emotional, tear-filled service." Cooke would be one of the original inductees into the Rock and Roll Hall of Fame in 1986.
  - Percy Kilbride, 76, American film actor best known as the co-star of the Ma and Pa Kettle movie series
  - Alma Mahler, 85, Austrian socialite who had been married to Gustav Mahler, Walter Gropius, and Franz Werfel

== December 12, 1964 (Saturday) ==
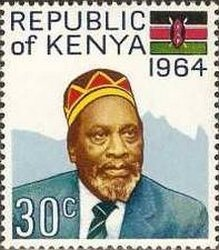
Kenya's President Kenyatta

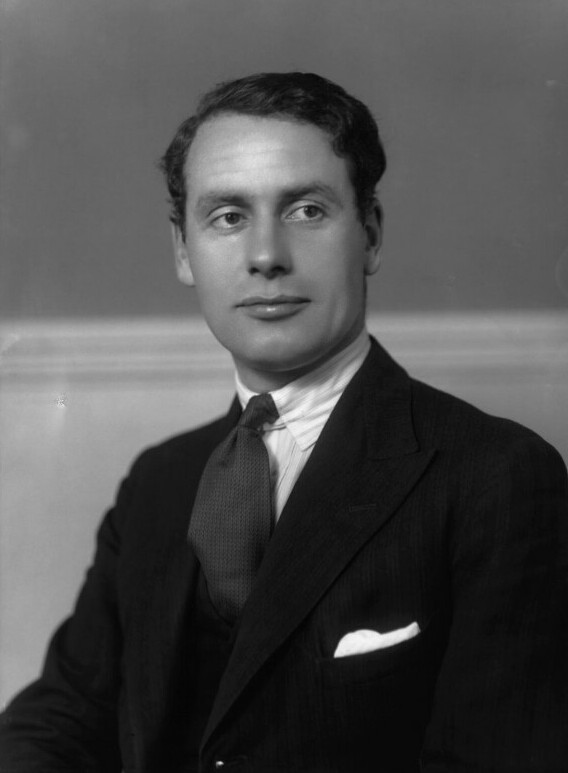
Former Kenyan Viceroy MacDonald

- On the first anniversary of its independence from the United Kingdom, the Dominion of Kenya became a republic, with Prime Minister Jomo Kenyatta as its first President. Malcolm MacDonald ended his service as the first, and only, Governor-General of Kenya but would continue to serve in a diplomatic role as Britain's High Commissioner and envoy to Kenya. Kenyatta would continue as President of Kenya until his death on August 22, 1978, and would be succeeded by Daniel Arap Moi.
- The President and Mrs. Johnson welcomed the first group of 20 volunteers in the new VISTA (Volunteers In Service To America) program at the White House.
- Four of the crew of the West German coaster Deutschland were killed when the ship sank in the Lower Elbe river after colliding with a Norwegian ship, the SS Vera.
- Born: Terry Brunk, American professional wrestler billed as "Sabu"; in Staten Island, New York
- Died: William Rootes, 70, British auto manufacturer and co-founder of the University of Warwick

== December 13, 1964 (Sunday) ==
- The Single Convention on Narcotic Drugs, an international convention between nations agreeing to prohibit the production, manufacture, export and import, and distribution of narcotics for any uses other than for medical and scientific purposes, went into effect less than four years after it had been signed on March 30, 1961. The Convention would be amended effective August 8, 1975.
- The Dutch coaster MV Tjoba capsized and sank in the Rhine river at Sankt Goar, West Germany. The ship was raised after eight days and it was discovered that the ship's cat had survived in an air pocket. The cat was taken to a veterinarian in Koblenz for treatment.
- Born:
  - Hide (stage name for Hideto Matsumoto), Japanese heavy metal musician who was lead guitarist of the rock band X Japan; in Yokosuka, Kanagawa, Japan (committed suicide, 1998)
  - Tony Roper, American NASCAR driver; in Springfield, Missouri (killed in auto race, 2000)
- Died: Ernesto Almirante, 87, Italian stage and film actor

== December 14, 1964 (Monday) ==
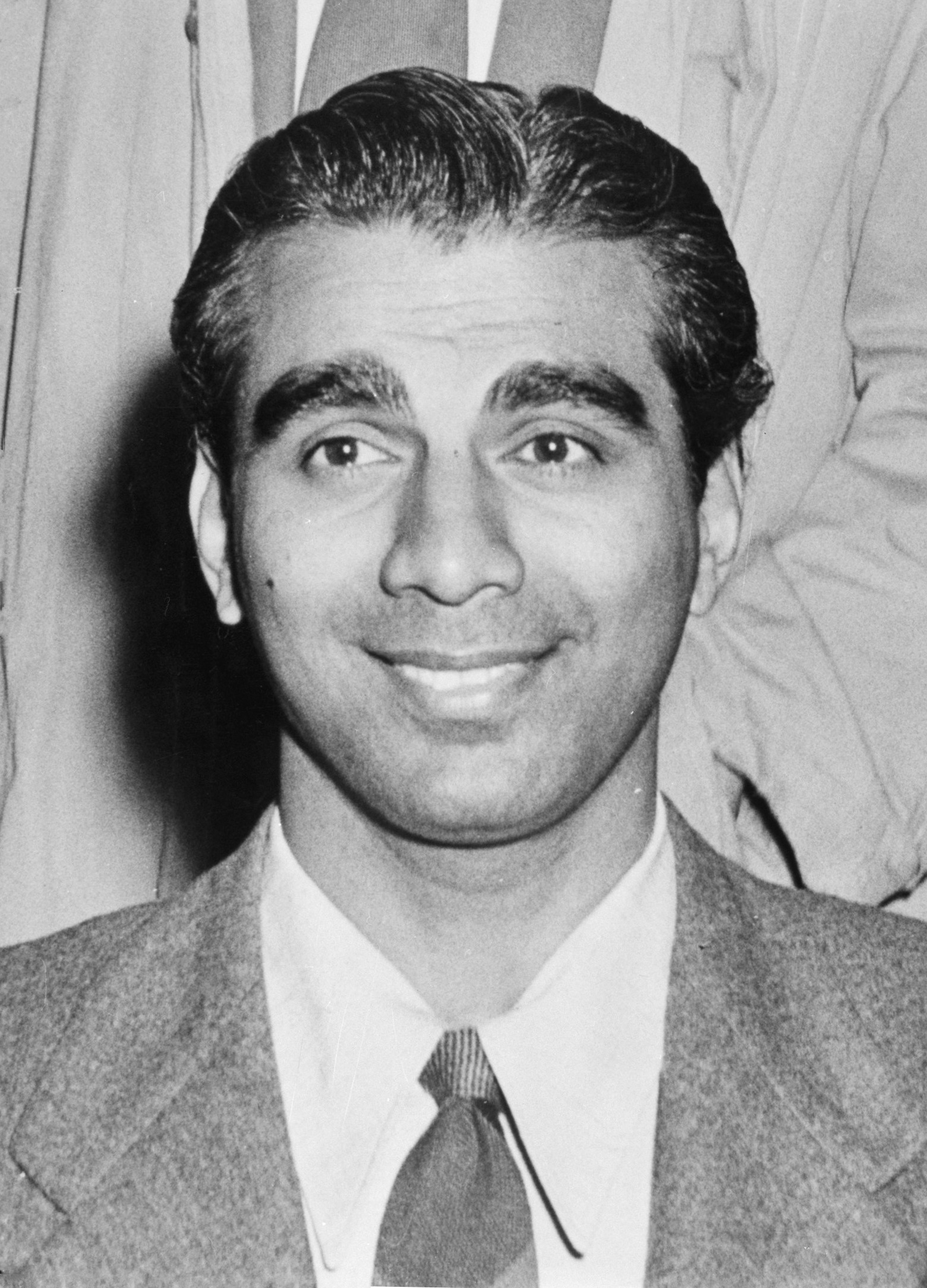
Jagan, fired after refusing to quit

- Forbes Burnham was sworn in as the new Premier of British Guiana (now Guyana) after the British colonial government was forced to remove his predecessor, Cheddi Jagan, from office following the December 7 assembly elections. Jagan, who had held office for 11 years, had refused to resign, charging that the election was fraudulent. Queen Elizabeth II signed a parliamentary order amending British Guiana's constitution to allow the colonial governor to remove the premier. The new law provided that "if any time before the House of Assembly meets the Governor informs the Premier that he is about to reappoint him or to appoint another person as Premier, then the Premier, and all other ministers and parliamentary secretaries, are forthwith to vacate their offices." The Governor, Sir Richard Luyt, then informed Jagan that Burnham would be appointed as the new Premier, and Burnham was sworn in on the same day. In 1992, Jagan would be elected as the third President of Guyana.
- Trinidad and Tobago changed their currency to the Trinidad and Tobago dollar, replacing the British West Indies dollar
- In two separate cases, Heart of Atlanta Motel v. United States and Katzenbach v. McClung, the U.S. Supreme Court upheld the constitutionality of the Civil Rights Act of 1964 in its prohibition of racial discrimination in lodging and in restaurants, respectively. Associate Justice Tom C. Clark wrote the majority opinions in both cases. In both cases, the Court rejected the argument that the businesses were not within the jurisdiction of the "Commerce Clause" of the U.S. Constitution, which permits (in Article I, Section 8) Congress "To regulate Commerce... among the several States" because neither the Atlanta motel, nor the Birmingham restaurant (Ollie's Barbecue) owned by McClung, were engaged in interstate commerce. Clark noted that the motel served travelers from other states, and that even if the restaurant's clientele were local, the food served by the restaurant moved in interstate commerce. Quoting in the Heart of Atlanta case from a 1949 Supreme Court decision, Justice Clark noted that "If it is interstate commerce that feels the pinch, it does not matter how local the operation which applies the squeeze."
- Operation Barrel Roll, the secret bombing of the neutral Kingdom of Laos by U.S. planes, began with U.S. Air Force bombers flying out of Thailand to attack suspected concentrations of Viet Cong guerrillas. Originally, attacks were limited to eight sorties per week but would increase in intensity and would last until the end of the war in 1973.
- Born:
  - Rebecca Gibney, New Zealand television and film actress known for the Australian TV comedy Packed to the Rafters; in Levin
  - Dino Stamatopoulos, American producer, writer, and actor; in Norridge, Illinois
  - Antje Vowinckel, German sound artist; in Hagen, West Germany
- Died:
  - William Bendix, 58, American film and radio actor known for being the title character in The Life of Riley, died from lobar pneumonia from a chronic stomach ailment.
  - Francisco Canaro, 76, Uruguayan-born composer

== December 15, 1964 (Tuesday) ==
- A team of Italian scientists launched San Marco 1, Italy's first satellite, from Wallops Island in the United States, marking the first time that a foreign launching crew had been allowed access to U.S. facilities. The 254-pound (115 kg) spacecraft was successfully placed into orbit around the Earth for purposes of studying the ionosphere.
- After a lengthy debate that ended at 2:12 in the morning, Canada's House of Commons voted 163 to 78 to approve the new Flag of Canada, with its pattern of a red maple leaf on a white background between two red bars. Voting then moved on to the Canadian Senate.
- Glenn T. Seaborg received a U.S. Patent No. 3,161,462 for the synthesized chemical element Curium. Seaborg had been granted a patent for Americium on November 10.
- The Gemini Phase II centrifuge training program was completed. Phase II provided refresher training for Gemini-Titan 3 and 4 flight crews, who made their runs clad in pressure suits. For astronauts not yet officially assigned to a mission the program provided familiarization training under shirt-sleeve conditions. Phase II had begun early in November 1964.

== December 16, 1964 (Wednesday) ==
- NASA Deputy Administrator Robert C. Seamans, Jr. authorized the Voyager program for exploration of the planets of the outer Solar System. With the go-ahead given, aerospace engineer Gary Flandro calculated that Jupiter, Saturn, Uranus and Neptune could all be reached over a series of years in a single "Grand Tour program" mission; by 1980, the four planets would be on the same side of the Solar System and, Flandro would determine, "Such an opportunity would not present itself again for another 176 years." Voyager 2 would be ready for launch on August 20, 1977 and would reach Jupiter on April 25, 1979; Saturn on June 5, 1981; Uranus on November 4, 1985; and Neptune on June 5, 1989.
- Born: Heike Drechsler, German athlete and winner of Olympic gold medals in the women's long jump in 1992 and 2000; in Gera, Bezirk Gera, East Germany
- Died:
  - Steponas Kairys, 85, Lithuanian independence leader and its first Minister of Industry and Trade from 1919 to 1920
  - Phil Davis, 58, American comic strip artist who illustrated Lee Falk's strip Mandrake the Magician, died of a heart attack.
  - Mary Sophia Allen, 86, English feminist leader and founder of the Women Police Volunteers

== December 17, 1964 (Thursday) ==
Canada's new flag

- The new Flag of Canada was hoisted up a flagpole by the government for the first time, displayed outside the Canadian Parliament hours after the Senate of Canada voted, 38 to 23, to approve the new maple leaf design. The House of Commons had approved the flag earlier in the week.
- In the United Kingdom, the House of Commons voted, 311 to 291, to transfer control of the British nuclear arsenal to NATO or to "some sort of new Atlantic command". In the debate in Commons, Prime Minister Harold Wilson told his chief critic, former Prime Minister Alec Douglas-Home, "Are you willing to go it alone in a war with Russia? Would you push the button setting off a kind of war that would mean total annihilation of all human life in Britain? If you can't answer that, you don't understand what the argument is all about."
- An accident killed 32 sailors, nearly all of them from Spain, on the converted T2 tanker cargo ship SS San Patrick, after the vessel ran aground on Ulak Island, the second-most western of the Aleutian Islands. The 521-foot (159 m) ship had been transporting grain from Vancouver to Yokohama when it encountered a heavy winter storm. It sent out three SOS distress calls. A search by the U.S. Navy did not discover the ship until three days later.
- Fernando Belaúnde Terry, the President of Peru, announced that the new agrarian law passed in the South American nation would be implemented in 1965, with the government expropriating farm lands (with payment for their owners financed through the sale of government bonds) and redistributing individual plots to the 56,000 peasant farmers who had been working on the farms as sharecroppers.
- Died: Victor Francis Hess, 81, Austrian-born physicist and 1936 Nobel Prize laureate for his discovery of cosmic rays

== December 18, 1964 (Friday) ==
- U.S. President Johnson announced at a press conference that he would seek to replace the 1903 Hay–Bunau-Varilla Treaty that gave the U.S. sovereignty over the Panama Canal, noting that "I have decided to propose to the government of Panama the negotiation of an entirely new treaty." Johnson noted that the new agreement would allow the U.S. to operate and protect the canal during a transitional period, with sovereignty of the Canal Zone being eventually turned over to Panama. In addition, Johnson said, he would start negotiations with Panama, Nicaragua, Costa Rica and Colombia for the rights to build a new canal.
- The deadly Christmas flood of 1964, which would kill 47 people during the holiday season, began with a powerful Pacific Ocean storm that brought record snowfalls in northern California, Oregon and Washington, with accumulations of up to 10 feet (3.0 m) in Oregon's Cascade Mountains. As warmer temperatures arrived from another front, the snowstorm "changed over to a torrential warm rain, with two months' worth falling in just five days and melting the snow at even the highest elevations", and swelling the Willamette River and the Umpqua River (and their tributaries).
- The Soviet Union partially reversed a policy of discouraging private individuals from owning their own farms. Gosbank, the national bank of the USSR, was authorized to make loans to collective farm workers to purchase livestock for their own use.
- Born: "Stone Cold" Steve Austin (ring name for Steven James Anderson), American professional wrestler; in Austin, Texas

== December 19, 1964 (Saturday) ==
- U.S. Congressman Gerald R. Ford of Michigan announced his intention to challenge minority leader Charles A. Halleck in January when Republican Party members of the U.S. House of Representatives would vote on their leader. Ford would narrowly win the vote on January 4, by a margin of 73 to 67, and would remain in the position until 1973, when he would be selected as the new Vice President of the United States and, ultimately, the nation's President upon the resignation of U.S. President Richard M. Nixon.
- A total lunar eclipse afforded astrophysicist J. M. Saari the opportunity to make infrared pyrometric scans of the lunar surface with improved equipment, following up on Richard W. Shorthill's discovery of "hot spots" in the Tycho crater during the March 13, 1960 eclipse. Saari carried out his observations from the Helwan Observatory in Egypt. The eclipse began at 0059 UTC (Friday evening in North and South America) and was visible from Western Europe and Africa as well.
- In a military coup, the ruling military junta of South Vietnam, led by General Nguyen Khanh, dissolved the High National Council and arrested some of its members. The next day, General Khanh announced that an Armed Forces Council would rule the nation. Khanh would be removed from power on February 24.
- The American Conservative Union (ACU), the oldest lobbying organization for conservative political action in the United States, was founded at a meeting by about 100 conservative leaders in Washington, D.C. Outgoing U.S. Congressman Donald C. Bruce was elected as the first chairman of the organization.
- Born: Arvydas Sabonis, Lithuanian professional basketball player and inductee into both the Naismith Basketball Hall of Fame in the U.S. and the FIBA Hall of Fame in Madrid; in Kaunas, Lithuanian SSR, Soviet Union

== December 20, 1964 (Sunday) ==
- A crash killed 41 train passengers and injured 75 in Mexico near the village of Tacotalpa when a freight train smashed into their car. A member of the freight train crew told authorities that "the engineer was apparently dozing and unaware of the train on the main track until the last moment." The engineer sustained minor injuries and fled from the scene of the accident.
- An explosion killed 57 coal miners in Peru at the Cerro de Pasco underground mine outside the mountain village of Goyllarisquizga.
- Born: Clara Rojas, Colombian politician who was kidnapped along with presidential candidate Íngrid Betancourt during the 2002 campaign and held captive for almost six years; in Bogotá

== December 21, 1964 (Monday) ==
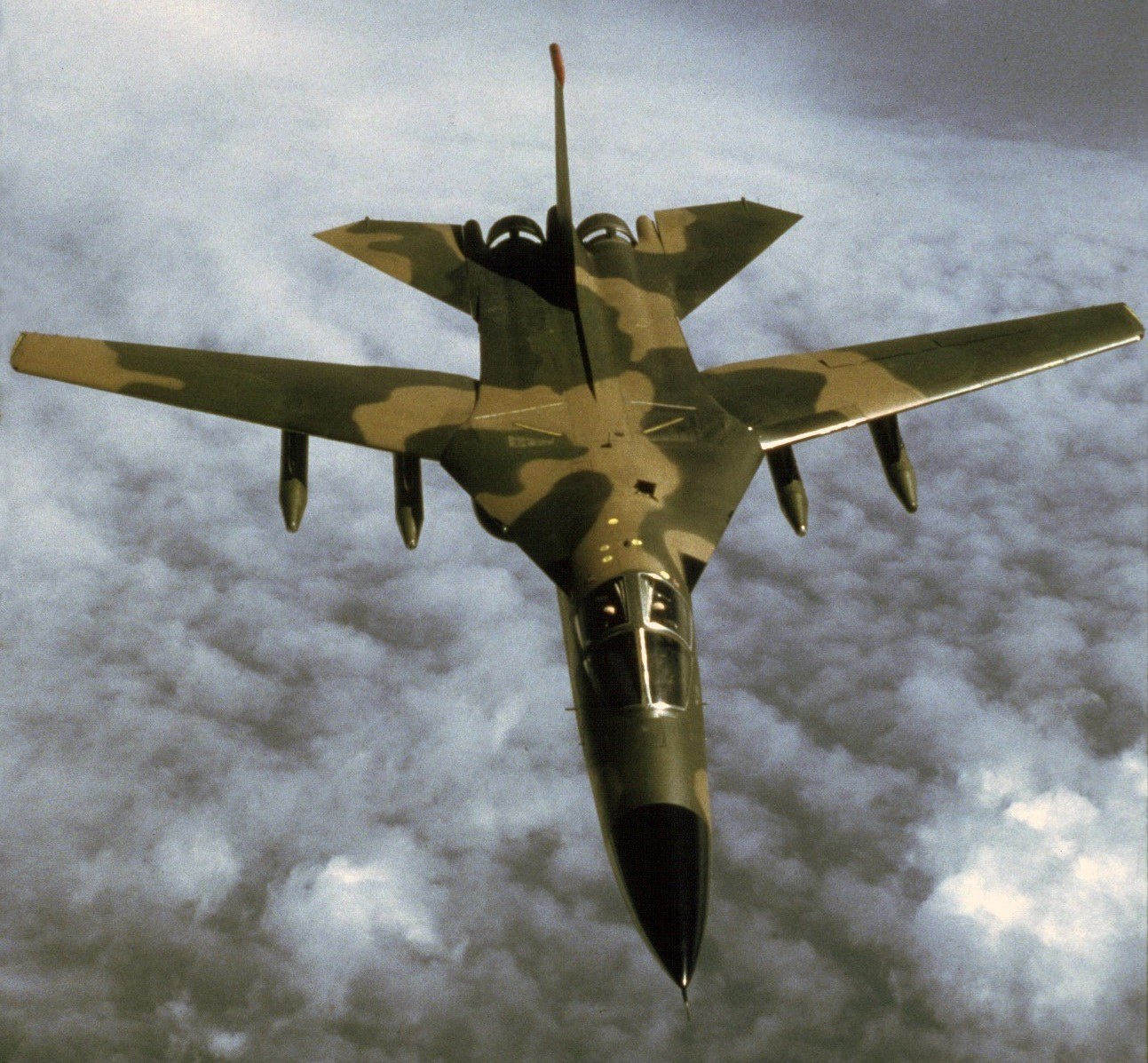
An F-111

- The supersonic F-111 tactical fighter aircraft, referred to commonly as the TFX (Tactical Fighter Experimental), made its first flight. The plane took off from Carswell Air Force Base in Texas, near the General Dynamics aircraft plant in Fort Worth. Richard L. Johnson and Val E. Prahl took the plane aloft but terminated the scheduled 90-minute flight after only 21 minutes when a wing flap jammed. Described as "probably the most controversial combat aircraft in American history" because of its mechanical problems and cost overruns, the F-111 also had one of the best safety records, and would still be used by the Royal Australian Air Force 50 years after its introduction.
- At the conclusion of his obscenity trial, American comedian Lenny Bruce was sentenced to four months in prison for "three counts of giving obscene performances in a Greenwich Village cafe" in New York City; the owner of Cafe Au Go Go was fined $1,000. Bruce was allowed to remain free on bond while he pursued an appeal of the verdict and would die of an overdose in 1966 while the conviction was still on appeal. Thirty-nine years later, on December 23, 2003, he would be granted a posthumous pardon by New York Governor George Pataki.
- A 30-year-old woman from Oakland, California, became the first person to survive a suicide attempt at the Bay Bridge, after leaping 230 feet (70 m) into the San Francisco Bay. Mrs. Isabelle Kainoa was despondent over an illness that kept her from seeing her children; a U.S. Coast Guard boat was patrolling the bay and came to her rescue. At least 59 people had preceded her in jumping from the span. Mrs. Kainoa sustained a fractured pelvis, but survived.
- Britain's House of Commons voted, 355 to 170, to abolish the death penalty for five years. The House of Lords would pass the Murder Act 1965 ten months later and it would receive royal assent on November 8, 1965; in 1969, the five year experiment would be made permanent.
- The James Bond film, Goldfinger, premiered in the United States, after being released in British theaters in September. The first U.S. showing was at the DeMille Theater in New York City.
- Died: Carl Van Vechten, 84, American photographer

== December 22, 1964 (Tuesday) ==
- At Palmdale, California, the Lockheed SR-71 Blackbird made its first flight. Lockheed's chief test pilot, Bob Gilliland, took the plane up to 50,000 feet (15,000 m) and pushed it to a speed of Mach 1.5, then returned without incident.
- Extremely heavy rain began that would cause the deaths of 34 people (24 in California and 10 in Oregon) and injured 1,653 others began in California and Oregon, primarily in Humboldt County, where 19 people drowned in the flooding of the Eel River and as well as the Russian River. The Christmas Flood destroyed nine communities in the Russian River valley, with a reporter noting that the 500-person town of Pepperwood "no longer exists except for jumbled debris and shattered wreckage of homes" and the villages of South Fork, Myers Flat, Stafford and Weott referred to as "written off."
- South Vietnam's head of state, General Nguyen Khanh, went back on his promise to leave the country and announced that "We make sacrifices for the country's independence and the Vietnamese people's liberty, but not to carry out the policy of any foreign country." Khanh's announcement came as part of his Order of the Day, a regular message to the armed forces over Radio Vietnam.
- Died: Rosa Borja de Ycaza, 75, Ecuadorian playwright and activist

== December 23, 1964 (Wednesday) ==
- A cyclone in the Palk Strait between India and Sri Lanka killed 1,800 people in the two nations. Hardest hit was the Indian town of Dhanushkodi, on Rameswaram Island. Located in the Tamil Nadu state, Dhanushkodi had 2,000 residents and had been "a bustling coastal town with pilgrims, travellers, fishermen, tourists and others" and the site of the Hindu temple of Vinayaka; it would remain abandoned more than 50 years later. The dead included 115 people who had been riding on a six-car passenger train from Pamban to Dhanushkodi when the wave struck. More than 52 years later, on July 27, 2017, Dhanushkodi would be connected to its neighbors again with the opening of National Highway 87 in a ceremony presided over by India's Prime Minister, Narendra Modi.
- "Wonderful Radio London", a pirate radio station, commenced transmissions with American top 40 format broadcasting, from a ship anchored off the south coast of England.
- Born: Eddie Vedder, American singer and guitarist for Pearl Jam; in Evanston, Illinois

== December 24, 1964 (Thursday) ==
- American comedian Bob Hope made his first Christmas visit to South Vietnam, as he and his 60-member troupe entertained 1,200 servicemen at the Bien Hoa Air Base. He opened by joking, "Hello, advisers. Here I am in Bien Hoa... which is Vietnamese for 'Duck!!'". Referring to his surroundings as "Sniper Valley", he said, "As I flew in today, they gave us a 21-gun salute... Three of them were ours."
- Apparently aimed at Hope's visit a time bomb set by Viet Cong terrorists exploded at Brinks, a U.S. Army officers club in Saigon, killing two Americans and wounding 50 others. Three years later, a captured memorandum was located that had criticized the terrorists for the fact that "The bomb exploded 10 minutes before the set time. Shortly after the explosion the cars of the Bob Hope entertainment group arrived. If the bomb exploded at the scheduled time, it might have killed an additional number of guests who came to see the entertainment."
- Unemployed electronics engineer Tom Osborne completed the prototype of the first desktop electronic calculator after more than a year of work at his home workshop, then spent another six months trying to find a buyer for his "Green Machine" (so called because he constructed the prototype casing from balsa wood painted green). After more than 30 rejections, he was able to sell the invention to the Hewlett-Packard company in Palo Alto, California.
- Arthur C. Clarke completed the first draft of his manuscript, "Journey Beyond the Stars", which would be adapted by Stanley Kubrick as the film 2001: A Space Odyssey.
- Died:
  - Michael Munnelly, 23, English journalist, was killed while assisting the victims of a riot in London. He would posthumously be awarded the George Cross.
  - Saint Kuksha of Odessa (Kuzma Kirillovich Velichko), 89, Ukrainian Orthodox Church clergyman later canonized as an Orthodox saint in 1995.
  - Claudia Jones, 49, Trinidanian black activist, died of a heart attack.
  - Badr Shakir al-Sayyab, 38, Iraqi poet, died from ALS.

== December 25, 1964 (Friday) ==
- The Soviet Union announced in its government newspaper, Izvestia, that it would experiment with a profit-oriented capitalist economy in certain factories in Lviv, the capital of the Ukrainian SSR, starting on January 1. Economist Evsei Liberman of the University of Lviv had proposed that directors of factories be given wide latitude in making production decisions with minimum oversight from the nation's central planning commission, and the test in two textile factories (in Moscow and in Gorky) had proven effective enough that Liberman selected be expanded from light industry into heavy industries. The factories that would carry out the pilot program in 1965 were "a plant producing loading machines"; the television set factory operated by the Progress Enterprise; the Zarya textile factory; and the Velkomostovskaya Number 9 coal mine.
- Born:
  - Ian Bostridge, English opera tenor; in Wandsworth, South LondonDebrett's People of Today 2005 (18th ed.). Debrett's. 2005. p. 175. ISBN 1-870520-10-6.
  - Jonas Sjöstedt, Swedish politician and chairman of Sweden's left-wing Vänsterpartiet political party; in Gothenburg
  - Ofer Cassif, Israeli Arab member of the Knesset since 2019; in Rishon LeZion

== December 26, 1964 (Saturday) ==
- France's National Assembly voted unanimously to approve Law No. 64-1326, declaring that there was no statute of limitations on crimes against humanity and war crimes.
- "Moors murderers" Ian Brady and Myra Hindley abducted Lesley Ann Downey, 10, in Manchester. They murdered her that evening and buried her body in a shallow grave on Saddleworth Moor the following morning.
- The Buffalo Bills defeated the visiting San Diego Chargers, 20 to 7, to win the American Football League championship.
- Born: Elizabeth Kostova, American novelist; in New London, Connecticut

== December 27, 1964 (Sunday) ==
- The American cargo ship Smith Voyager sank under tow in the South Atlantic, having been disabled on 21 December following a shift in her cargo of grain. She foundered due to the rupturing of a seam. Four crew drowned, the remaining crew were rescued by a United States Coast Guard cutter.
- The Cleveland Browns defeated the visiting Baltimore Colts, 27 to 0, to win the National Football League championship.
- Born: Ian Gomez, American actor; in New York City
- Died: Francesco Spoto, 40, Italian Roman Catholic priest and missionary to the Congo, died of injuries sustained while he was held hostage by the Simba rebels.

== December 28, 1964 (Monday) ==
- Giuseppe Saragat was elected President of Italy after 13 days and 21 ballots by the 963 members of the Italian Parliament in joint session (642 from the Chamber of Deputies and 321 from the Senate of the Republic). On the first 20 votes, no candidate received the necessary majority (482 or more votes). On the 21st ballot, Foreign Minister Saragat got 646 votes to be selected as the first Socialist Italian president. Former Premier Giovanni Leone had received a plurality of the votes in the first 15 ballots; on the next four ballots, Deputy Premier Pietro Nenni had a plurality (and a 385–323 lead over Saragat on the 20th ballot) before authorizing his supporters to vote for Saragat on the 21st ballot.
- PepsiCo introduced Diet Pepsi to the public as a variant of Pepsi with no sugar. The product was first tested in 1963 under the name Patio Diet Cola, it was re-branded as Diet Pepsi the following year, becoming the second diet cola to be distributed on a national scale in the United States, after Diet Rite.

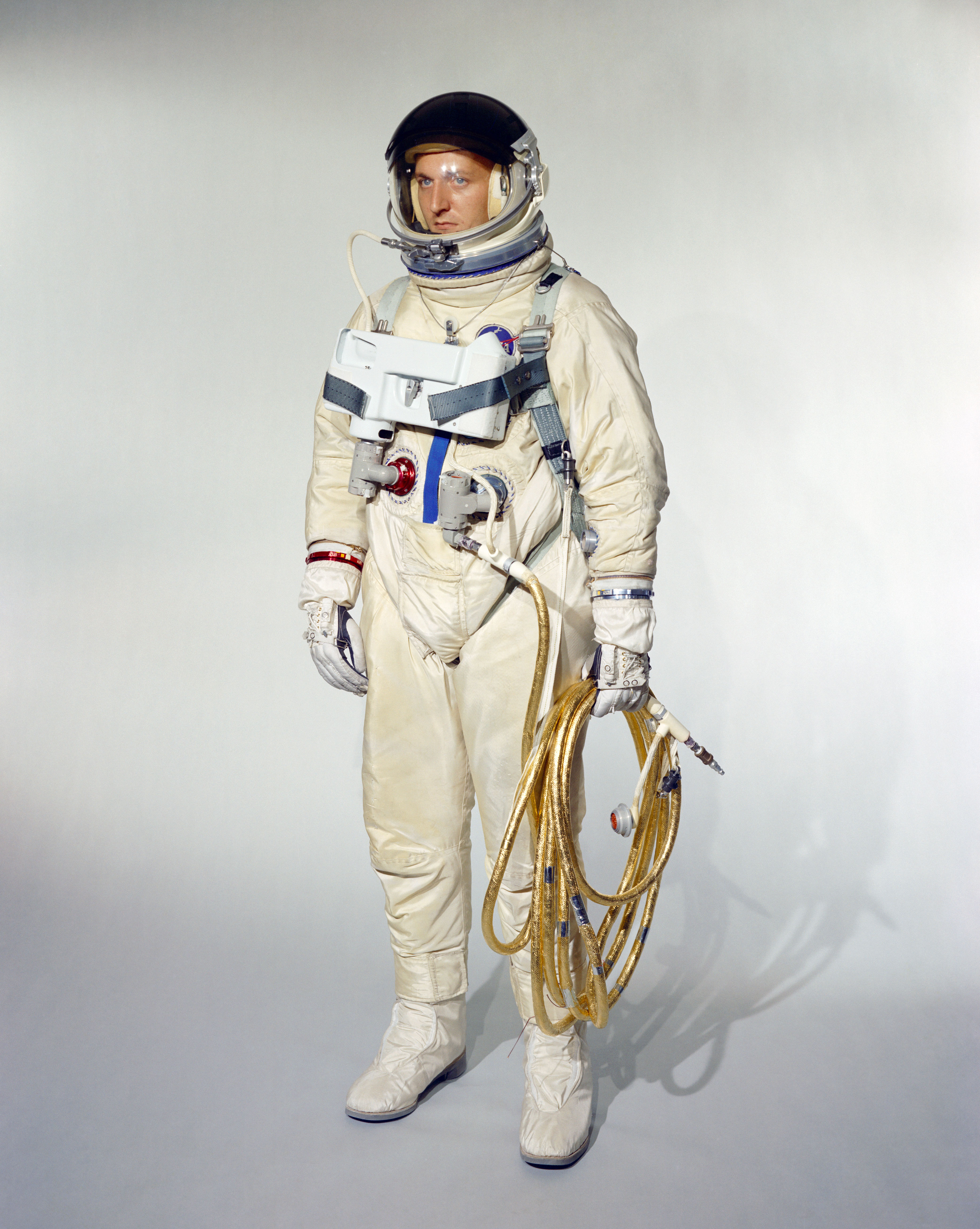
Gemini G4C extravehicular spacesuit

- Crew Systems Division received a prototype G4C extravehicular Gemini space suit for testing. This suit contained a thermal/micrometeoroid cover layer, a redundant closure, and the open visor assembly for visual, thermal, and structural protection. Zero-gravity tests in January 1965 showed the suit to be generally satisfactory, but the heavy cover layer made moving around in it awkward. The cover layer was redesigned to remove excess bulk. The new cover layer proved satisfactory when it was tested in February 1965.
- Born: Moïse Katumbi, Congolese businessman and politician who governed the Katanga province from 2007 to 2015; in Kashobwe, Democratic Republic of the Congo
- Died: Cliff Sterrett, 81, American comic strip artist who drew the long-running feature Polly and Her Pals from 1912 to 1958

== December 29, 1964 (Tuesday) ==
- Beloved film actor and action hero John Wayne went against the advice of his agent and several advisers and revealed that he had been treated for lung cancer with the removal of his left lung in September. He told reporters at his home in Encino, California, "I licked the Big C. I know the man upstairs will pull the plug when he wants to, but I don't want to end my life being sick." The Associated Press commented that "The always honest Wayne refused to abide by the Hollywood code that cancer or any other serious illness could destroy a box office image." After four months' rest, Wayne, who had been a five-pack-a-day cigarette smoker, returned to filmmaking to appear in the western The Sons of Katie Elder. He would survive for more than 14 years, winning an Academy Award for Best Actor in True Grit, and portraying a cancer sufferer in his final film, The Shootist. Wayne would die of stomach cancer on June 11, 1979.
- Congolese government forces and white mercenaries rescued 120 white hostages from the captivity of the Simba rebels, after successfully storming the town of Wamba in the northeastern part of the African nation. Located in the Haut-Uele province on the upper Uele River, Wamba was one of the few remaining locations where a large number of European hostages had been kept. At least 25 other foreign hostages had been killed by the rebels; a news dispatch noted that "Reliable sources quoted survivors as saying that the rebels had killed and eaten about 10 white hostages on Christmas Day."
- The three-act play Tiny Alice, written by Edward Albee, premiered on Broadway at the Billy Rose Theatre and ran for 167 performances. Its female lead, Irene Worth, would win a Tony Award for Best Actress, and the play would receive five other Tony Award nominations.
- Died: Vladimir Favorsky, 78, Russian artist and engraver

== December 30, 1964 (Wednesday) ==
- Law enforcement officers in India arrested more than 500 pro-Chinese Indian communists in a predawn raid throughout the Kerala state, and charged them with planning "nationwide sabotage and violent revolution". Those arrested included at least one member of the Lok Sabha, India's national parliament, as A. K. Copalan was picked up.
- Mount Paget, the highest point on South Georgia Island, was successfully climbed for the first time. The team of British servicemen, led by Royal Navy Commander Malcolm Burley, reached the 9,629 foot (2,935 m) tall peak as part of the Joint Services Commission.
- The United Nations Conference on Trade and Development (UNCTAD) was established as a permanent organ of the UN General Assembly.
- Died:
  - Andrés Soriano, 66, Philippine business magnate and philanthropist who founded his nation's largest conglomerate, the San Miguel Corporation, as well as Philippine Airlines.
  - Hans Gerhard Creutzfeldt, 79, German neurologist who first described the brain disorder Creutzfeldt–Jakob disease.

== December 31, 1964 (Thursday) ==
- The Bracero Program, established in the United States in 1942 in order to allow migrant workers from Mexico to cross into the U.S. to work, "was quietly allowed to expire" after the U.S. Congress declined to renew it for another term. "As the New Year dawned," an author would later note, "braceros began returning to Mexico by the thousands."
- Fatah, a Palestinian nationalist organization, launched its first attempt at paramilitary action against Israel with an unsuccessful attempt to sabotage the plant of the National Water Carrier of Israel.
- Born:
  - Max Siegel, Chief Executive Officer since 2012 of USA Track & Field (USATF); in Los Angeles, California
  - Michael McDonald, American stand-up comedian, actor, screenwriter, and director; in Fullerton, California
- Died:
  - Ólafur Thors, 72, former Prime Minister of Iceland on five occasions between 1942 and 1963
  - Ronald Fairbairn, 75, Scottish psychoanalyst who formulated the object relations theory
  - Henry Maitland Wilson, 83, British Army field marshal
