= Bafwabaka =

- Location within Democratic Republic of the Congo
- Coordinates: 0.567847°N 27.3666°E
- Country: Democratic Republic of the Congo
- Province: Tshopo

Bafwabaka is a place in the eastern part of Tshopo in the Democratic Republic of the Congo. There is/was a Catholic convent. In the 1964 civil war, all 46 nuns were kidnapped by Simba rebels and taken to Wamba, and later to Isiro where some of them were killed, among them Marie-Clémentine Anuarite Nengapeta.
