= Sri Sithi Vinayagar Temple =

Hindu Temple

- Malay: Kuil Sri Sithi Vinayagar; Tamil: ஸ்ரீ சித்தி விநாயகர் கோயில்
- Location in Malaysia

Religion
- Affiliation: Hinduism
- Deity: Ganesha

Location
- Location: Petaling Jaya
- State: Selangor
- Country: Malaysia
- Coordinates: 3.091121°N 101.645544°E

Architecture
- Type: Dravidian architecture
- Creator: Petaling Jaya Hindu Association
- Completed: 1964

Sri Sithi Vinayagar Temple is a Hindu temple located along Jalan Selangor in Petaling Jaya, Selangor, Malaysia. It is also generally referred to as the PJ Pillaiyar Temple. The resident deity is Ganesha in the form of Sri Sithi Vinayagar. The temple is said to be the largest temple in Malaysia dedicated to Lord Ganesha.

The temple was completed in 1964 following Dravidian architecture and remains one of the main Hindu temples serving the religious needs of the Hindu population of Petaling Jaya. It is run by the Petaling Jaya Hindu Association.

== History ==
The history of the Sri Sithi Vinayagar Temple dates back to the early 1950s when Petaling Jaya was established as a residential suburb to ease over-population of fast growing Kuala Lumpur. The new township attracted many residents and soon the Hindu population of Petaling Jaya increased dramatically. At this stage, the pioneer Hindu residents felt the great need for their own place of worship. This temple was one of the first Vinayagar Temple in Malaysia

=== Establishment of PJHA ===
Through the efforts of a pro-tem committee, the Petaling Jaya Hindu Association [PJHA] was officially registered in 1959 with the main aim of establishing and managing a place of worship for Hindus in Petaling Jaya. It was unanimously decided that Lord Ganesha in the form of Sri Sithi Vinayagar be enshrined in the proposed temple.

=== 1st Maha Kumbabishegam ===
The foundation stone for the temple was laid by philanthropist Sri P. Govindasamy Pillai J.P of Singapore on 8 July 1962. Building works progressed on schedule and the 1st Maha Kumbabishegam of the Sri Sithi Vinayagar Temple, Petaling Jaya was held on 8 November 1964 to consecrate the temple.

A single-storey block to house the Association's office and residences for the temple employees was included in this initial phase of development. The Hindu population of Petaling Jaya increased tremendously and soon the facilities in the temple were found to be inadequate. Temporary iron-angle extensions were built adjacent to the temple to provide additional space for the increasing number of devotees.

=== 2nd Maha Kumbabishegam ===
The next phase of development was launched in 1972. Permanent extensions, reconstruction of the gopuram with additional sculpture works and an Eluntharuli mandapam were included in this project. The second Maha Kumbabishegam of the temple was celebrated on 4 September 1972.

New quarters for the priest was constructed at the rear of the temple in 1982.

=== Multi-Purpose Mandapam ===
The need for proper facilities to conduct various cultural and social activities prompted the PJHA to embark on the next phase of the development – the construction of a multi-purpose wedding hall. Construction of the 2-storey building costing RM 580,000 was carried out in 1985 and 1986. The old office building and staff residence block was demolished, to make way for the new Hall.

Based on the advice of professional consultants, a resolution was adopted unanimously by the AGM on 24 December 1989, to empower the management committee to undertake the construction of a completely new temple to replace existing one. Plans were drawn for a new temple and the Baalasthaapanam ceremony was carried out on 4 July 1990.

Following the Baalasthaapanam, the PJHA went through a rather turbulent period of two years, during which differences of opinion and technical problems brought the temple construction project to a standstill. The project was reactivated in 1992. The old temple building and the priest's quarters were dismantled in October 1992.

=== 3rd Maha Kumbabishegam ===
The foundation stone for the new temple was laid on 30 November 1992, in a ceremony officiated by Swami Guhabaktananda of the Divine Life Society. Sixteen sculptors from India under the supervision of a qualified sthapathy worked tirelessly to ensure that work progressed on schedule. Construction of the beautiful new temple with a majestic towering Rajagopuram and twin bell towers was completed on schedule culminating with the Maha Kumbabishegam on 12 June 1994.

Following the Kumbabishegam, major renovations were carried out on the multi-purpose hall in 1995. The mandapam was given a facelift and air-conditioned.

=== 4th Maha Kumbabshegam ===
As required by the Agamic principles, that temples should undergo renovations in cycles of 12 years, the management committee initiated the 4th Maha Kumbabishegam project in December 2006. The Balasthabanam ceremony was held on 3 November 2006. Works to repair, refurbish and repaint the temple progressed steadily. The Marathadi Pillaiyar and Sri Durgai Amman Shrines were relocated and restructured. Following the completion of the required renovations and repairs to the temple, the 4th Maha Kumbabishegam was conducted on 7 February 2007.

== Resident Deity ==
Vinayaka (Sanskrit: विनायक; IAST: vināyaka) is a common name for Ganesha that appears in the Purāṇas and in Buddhist Tantras.

Ganesha is widely revered as the Remover of Obstacles and more generally as Lord of Beginnings and Lord of Obstacles (Vighnesha (Sanskrit: विघ्नेश; IAST: Vighneśa), Vighneshvara (Sanskrit: विघ्नेश्वर; IAST: Vighneśvara)), patron of arts and sciences, and the deva of intellect and wisdom. He is honoured at the beginning of rituals and ceremonies and invoked as Patron of Letters during writing sessions.

A prominent name for Ganesha in the Tamil language is Pille or Pillaiyar (Little Child). A. K. Narain differentiates these terms by saying that pille means a "child" while pillaiyar means a "noble child". He adds that the words pallu, pella, and pell in the Dravidian family of languages signify "tooth or tusk of an elephant", but more generally "elephant". Anita Raina Thapan notes that the root word pille in the name Pillaiyar might have originally meant "the young of the elephant", because the Pali word pillaka means "a young elephant".

== Religious and cultural activities ==
In the 1980s due importance was given to the propagation of religion and development of culture, in line with one of the main aims of the PJHA. Religious education, Thirumurai and Tamil language classes were conducted for children. Cultural presentations and religious discourses were held in conjunction with Guru-poojas and major festivals such as Maha Sivaratri and Navarathri.

== Festivals ==
Ganesha Chathurthi is observed grandly by the temple as it is a major festival for the resident deity, Ganesha. Prayers are held for a week and food served to the public.

The temple is particularly packed on Deepavali with devotees eager to offer their prayers on the holy day. Other festivals observed include Maha Sivaratri and Navarathri.

== Sources ==
- Courtright, Paul B. (1985), Gaṇeśa: Lord of Obstacles, Lord of Beginnings, New York: Oxford University Press, ISBN 978-0195057423
- Heras, H. (1972), The Problem of Ganapati, Delhi: Indological Book House
- Saraswati, Swami Tattvavidananda (2004), Gaṇapati Upaniṣad, Delhi: D.K. Printworld Ltd., ISBN 978-8124602652
