= Marie-Clémentine Anuarite Nengapeta =

Congolese Catholic martyr (1939-1964)

Blessed Marie-Clémentine Anuarite Nengapeta
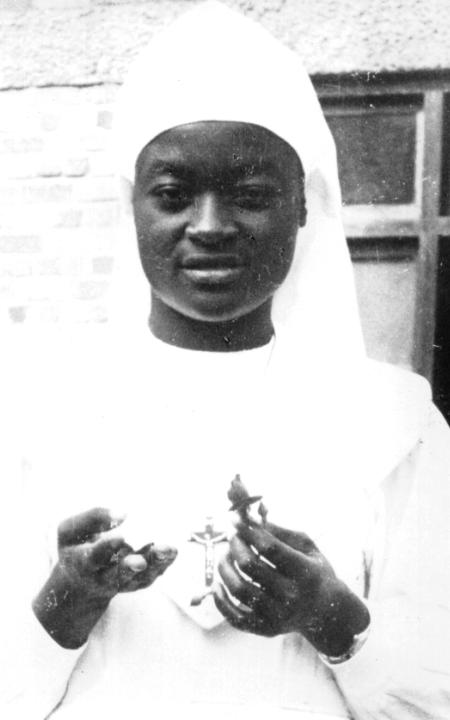
- Bl. Marie-Clémentine Anuarite Nengapeta

Virgin and martyr
- Born: 29 December 1939; Wamba, Haut-Uele, Orientale, Democratic Republic of Congo
- Died: 1 December 1964 (aged 24); Isiro, Haut-Uele, Orientale, Democratic Republic of Congo
- Venerated in: Roman Catholic Church
- Beatified: 15 August 1985, Kinshasa, Democratic Republic of Congo by Pope John Paul II
- Feast: 1 December

Marie-Clémentine Anuarite Nengapeta (29 December 1939 – 1 December 1964), born Anuarite Nengapeta, was a Congolese Catholic martyr and member of the Sisters of the Holy Family.

Her mother had all her children along with her baptized in 1945. Anuarite ran away from home to join the convent, despite her mother's disapproval. Her short religious life was dedicated to teaching and serving as a cook and sacristan. Nengapeta was killed during the nation's civil war during the Simba revolt in 1964 when Colonel Pierre Olombe killed her after she warded off his rape attempts.

Nengapeta is the first Bantu Catholic blessed, with her beatification occurring on 15 August 1985.

== Life ==
=== Childhood ===
Nengapeta was born in Wamba in the Democratic Republic of Congo on 29 December 1939 to Amisi Batsuru Batobobo and Isude Julienne as the fourth of six daughters; she belonged to the Wabudu tribe. The fifth and sixth were twins. Her father – a former soldier – dismissed his wife in order to take another wife so that he might have a son, but she turned out to be sterile. As a child she forgave her father for leaving her mother. Nengapeta – and her birth mother – were both baptized together in 1945 and she took the name "Alphonsine". It seems she was baptized twice because her original certificate of baptism was lost. One sister was Léontine Anuarite.

Nengapeta once saw a goat get butchered and she refused to eat the meat because she said its blood was much like hers. Each time she finished school she went to help her grandmother with tasks. Once she began her schooling her registration had an error with her sister's name instead of the name she had been given at baptism. Her sister took her to register for her schooling but the Belgian religious sister who met them erred and signed her up with her baptismal name and sister's name. Therefore her name – just Nengapeta – is now viewed as Anuarite Nengapeta.

=== Religious ===
Nengapeta decided to pursue the religious life, for she admired the sisters and respected Sister Ndakala Marie-Anne. Her mother was against her vocation so she decided to do something about it after learning a truck arrived at the local mission to bring postulants to a convent. She did not tell her mother and instead boarded the truck unseen and went off to the convent. Her mother searched for a week but learned of what happened to her daughter from a village child; her mother was frustrated but did not demand her daughter return, knowing it was to be. The girl entered the religious life in 1959, assuming the name of "Marie-Clémentine" at her profession on 5 August. Her parents were at her profession celebration and gave two goats to the sisters to express their happiness, though her mother later wanted her to return home to give them financial support. There was one occasion when Marie-Clémentine attacked a hoodlum in anger when he was making overtures to one of the nuns.

=== Capture and death ===
In 1964 the Simba rebellion broke out across the nation and the Simba rebels opposed Westerners but also the indigenous monks and sisters because of their suspicion that these religious were cooperating with foreigners. The rebels stormed her convent on 29 November 1964 and loaded all 46 of them into a truck telling them, it was to make sure they knew their math and school subjects. They were told the truck would go to Wamba, though it set off instead for Isiro to Colonel Yuma Déo's compound. Colonel Ngalo, with the aid of the soldier Sigbande, tried to get her to be his wife and threatened her with death when she kept refusing. Ngalo turned to fellow Colonel Olombe (b. 1938) for his help in seducing her. For dinner on 30 November she had rice and sardines with a fellow religious and warned her sisters not to drink the beer. Olombe then sent the sisters off to bed and asked her to remain behind for he wanted her for himself. He insulted her when she refused his offers and so forced her and Sister Bokuma Jean-Baptiste into a car. The two tried to escape as he went back to the compound for the keys but he caught and began beating them. Bokuma fainted after he broke her arm in three places, while he called some rebels to stab Nengapeta before pulling a revolver and shooting her in the chest.

Olombe ordered some sisters to remove her from his sight but she was still breathing for several minutes before she died around 1:00 am on 1 December 1964. Between the blows she had the strength to tell her attacker: "I forgive you, for you know not what you are doing". Her remains were buried in a common grave but were exhumed eight months later and reburied. Her remains were later exhumed in December 1978 and it was found she had an image of the Mother of God in her right hand. Her remains – after exhumation – were then moved to the Isiro Cathedral. Olombe was sentenced to death in 1965 but escaped from prison. He returned to prison and his sentence was commuted to life imprisonment in 1966, though he received a pardon in 1971.

=== The Anuarite Woman of Courage Prize ===
The Anuarite Woman of Courage in the D.R.C. Prize was established in 2009, named after the late sister to honor her courage and strength. The prize is meant to recognize and honor the vital contribution of women to the development of democratic values in the nation. On an annual basis a cash prize is awarded to a Congolese woman who helped to make her area a better place through hard work and dedication.

== Beatification ==
The beatification cause commenced under Pope Paul VI on 14 April 1977 and she became titled as a Servant of God. A cognitional process was opened in the Isiro-Niangara diocese from 13 January 1978 until later in 1978. Her writings received theological approval on 9 May 1980 before the Congregation for the Causes of Saints validated the cognitional process on 12 February 1982. The cause's officials sent the Positio in 1983 before theologians approved the cause on 21 February 1984 as did the C.C.S. on 17 April 1984.

Pope John Paul II approved this cause on 9 June 1984 and beatified Nengapeta on 15 August 1985 during his visit to Zaire. She is the first Bantu woman elevated to the altars with her beatification. To the left of the altar sat the late sister's parents. The pope expressed that he also forgave her killer. There were around 60,000 people at the beatification and it was rumored that her killer was present, as was President Mobutu Sese Seko.

Her killer tried to secure a meeting with the pope to express his great remorse but it was denied. Joaquín Navarro said the audience was refused because the former colonel made the request through a news editor who interviewed him. One source said a contributing factor was that he was considered to be unstable.

The current postulator for this cause is Fr. José Antonio Pérez Sánchez.

She is a patron of the African Jesuit AIDS Network.
