= Federal Correctional Institution, Lewisburg =

Federal prison in Pennsylvania, United States

Coordinates: 40.9880°N 76.9149°W

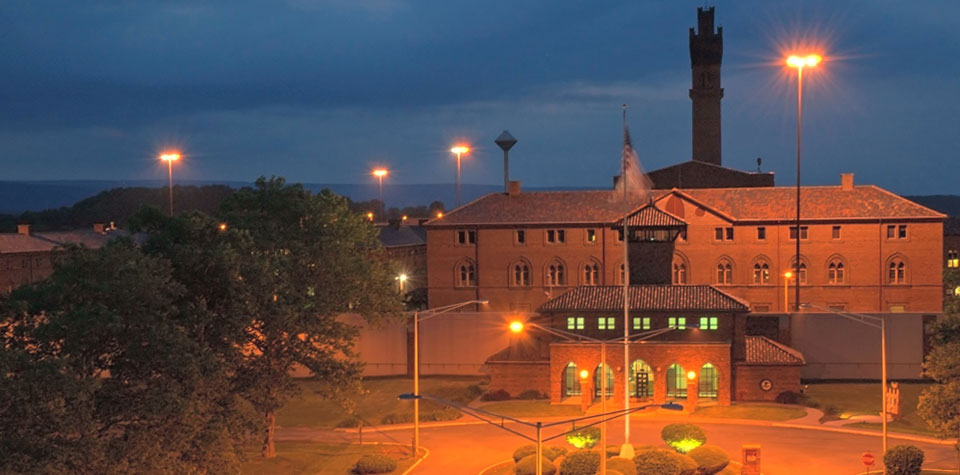
- Interactive map of Federal Correctional Institution, Lewisburg
- Location: Kelly Township, Union County, near Lewisburg, Pennsylvania
- Status: Operational
- Security class: Medium-security (with minimum-security prison camp)
- Population: 993 [684 at the USP, 309 in prison camp] (September 2023)
- Opened: 1932
- Managed by: Federal Bureau of Prisons
- Warden: Jeffrey Butler
- Website: www.bop.gov/locations/institutions/lew/index.jsp

The Federal Correctional Institution, Lewisburg (FCI Lewisburg) is a medium-security United States federal prison in Kelly Township, Pennsylvania, for male inmates. It is operated by the Federal Bureau of Prisons, a division of the United States Department of Justice. An adjacent satellite prison camp houses minimum-security male offenders.

== History ==
=== 20th century ===
Initially named North Eastern Penitentiary, USP Lewisburg was one of four federal prisons to open in 1932. It was designed by Alfred Hopkins.

In 1976, the prison was criticized by Judge Clarence Newcomer, who had released inmate Francis Marziani early, upon the disclosure that Marziani had been one of many victims of gang rape during an unusual wave of rape, torture, and murder by inmates in the prison.

USP Lewisburg was the focus of the 1991 Academy Award-nominated documentary Doing Time: Life Inside the Big House by filmmakers Alan and Susan Raymond. The one-hour film discussed conditions inside the prison, the removal of parole within the federal penitentiary system, and many of the fears held by many prisoners about re-integrating into society upon their release.

On November 1, 1995, USP Lewisburg had a prison riot. It was started by ten prisoners, although more than twenty required medical care, including one with broken bones and missing teeth. Many were sentenced to solitary confinement and more than 400 prisoners were transferred. This incident thrust USP Lewisburg into the national spotlight, where it gained much of its current notoriety.

A local non-profit group, the Lewisburg Prison Project, helps prisoners at Lewisburg USP and the surrounding area with issues of conditions of confinement.

=== 21st century ===
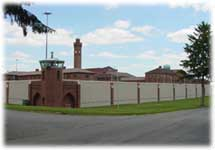
USP Lewisburg's entrance gate

In July 2008, correction officers at USP Lewisburg expressed concerns about underfunding. Over the past four years, union leaders and other officials had been lobbying in an attempt to quell staff reductions and cutting costs. The Federal Bureau of Prisons had proposed $143 million in possible spending cuts, including not replacing vehicles and equipment, eliminating overtime, reducing corrections officer training, and a possible cut in officer staff positions. Under such conditions, many of the Correctional Officers expressed concerns about their own safety.

As of 2009, USP Lewisburg was designated as a Special Management Unit intended to house the most violent and disruptive inmates in the Bureau of Prisons. Although most USP Lewisburg inmates are housed in the SMU, there remains a work cadre of about 200 inmates in the USP's general population.

As of February 2021, USP Lewisburg was changed from a high-security institution to medium security, becoming the third location within the BOP for Communications management units (CMU), alongside USP Marion and FCI Terre Haute. Offenders in the CMU will mostly be terrorists and inmates the BOP classifies as security threats who will be held in solitary confinement for 23 hours a day. The Special Management Unit (SMU) that was operated at Lewisburg is now at USP Thomson, which opened in 2019.

== Notable inmates (current and former) ==
- †Inmates released before 1982 are not listed on the Federal Bureau of Prisons website.
- ††Inmates in the Federal Witness Protection Program are not listed on the Federal Bureau of Prisons website.

=== Organized crime figures ===
Inmate name	Register number	Photo	Status	Details
Whitey Bulger	02182-748		Held at USP Lewisburg from 1963 to 1965.	Organized crime boss in Boston, Massachusetts in the 1970s and 1980s; FBI Ten Most Wanted Fugitive until his capture in 2011; known as "Whitey".
Osiel Cárdenas Guillén	62604-079		Transferred to USP Terre Haute. Served a 25-year sentence, released on August 30, 2024. Now in custody of ICE.	Succeeded Juan García Ábrego as leader of the Gulf Cartel; extradited to the U.S. from Mexico in 2007 and pleaded guilty to threatening to murder U.S. law enforcement agents, drug trafficking and money laundering.
Thomas DeSimone	Unlisted†		Sentenced to ten years for hijacking	Associate of the Lucchese crime family in New York City; portrayed by Joe Pesci in the 1990 film Goodfellas.
John Gotti	18261-053		Held at USP Lewisburg from 1969 to 1972.	Boss of the Gambino crime family in New York City from 1985 to 1992; convicted of murder, murder conspiracy, loansharking, illegal gambling, obstruction of justice, bribery, and tax evasion in 1992.
Henry Hill	Unlisted†		Held at USP Lewisburg from 1972 to 1978.	Former associate of the Lucchese crime family in New York City; portrayed by Ray Liotta in the 1990 film Goodfellas.
Jimmy Hoffa	Unlisted†		Held at USP Lewisburg from 1967 to 1971.	American labor union leader who disappeared in 1975. Sentence was commuted in 1971.
Enoch L. Johnson	Unlisted†		Held at USP Lewisburg from 1941 to 1945.	New Jersey political boss and racketeer; served as an inspiration for the character Enoch Thompson, who is portrayed by Steve Buscemi in the HBO television series Boardwalk Empire.
Gerard Ouimette	02519-070		Died while serving a life sentence in 2015	Former mafioso from Providence, Rhode Island; associate of the Patriarca crime family
Anthony Provenzano	00625-050		Held at USP Lewisburg from 1966 to 1970.	Also known as Tony Pro. Was a caporegime of the Genovese crime family New Jersey faction. An associate of Jimmy Hoffa. President of Teamsters Local 560 in Union City, New Jersey.
David Thai	38263-053		Currently incarcerated at FMC Devens	Founder and crime boss of the Vietnamese Born to Kill gang during the late 1980s and early 1990s, and was one of the largest purveyors of counterfeit watches in the New York counterfeiting industry. Was convicted of murder, extortion, racketeering alongside a multitude of charges in 1992 by a federal judge in Brooklyn.
Ronnie Trucchio	00705-748		Currently incarcerated at FCI Schuylkill, serving a life sentence.	New York mobster with the Gambino crime family who ran The Ozone Park Boys crew during the 1990s.
Paul Vario	16522-053		Held at USP Lewisburg from 1973 to 1975.	Former Caporegime and Underboss of the Lucchese crime family in New York City; portrayed by Paul Sorvino in the 1990 film Goodfellas.
Melvin Williams	47842-066		Spent a portion of his sentence at USP Lewisburg; released in 1996.	Former organized crime figure in Baltimore, Maryland; convicted of heroin trafficking in 1985; served as an inspiration for the character Avon Barksdale in the HBO series The Wire.
Chuck Zito	12032-054		Held at USP Lewisburg in 1986 as a "holdover" pending his transfer to FCI Petersburg	President of the New York Nomads chapter of the Hells Angels; pleaded guilty to conspiracy to distribute methamphetamine in 1986.

=== Terrorists ===
Inmate Name	Register Number	Status	Details
Edwin Cortes	92153-024	Held at USP Lewisburg from 1981 until 1999; their sentences were commuted by President Bill Clinton.	Puerto Rican nationalists; convicted in 1981 of seditious conspiracy and other charges for their roles in numerous bombings aimed at achieving independence for Puerto Rico.
Ricardo Jimenez	88967-024	Held at USP Lewisburg from 1981 until 1999; their sentences were commuted by President Bill Clinton.	Puerto Rican nationalists; convicted in 1981 of seditious conspiracy and other charges for their roles in numerous bombings aimed at achieving independence for Puerto Rico.
Abdel Nur	64655-053	Served a 15-year sentence, released and deported to Guyana in 2020.	Convicted in 2012 for conspiracy to commit a terrorist attack at JFK Airport.
Joe Doherty	07792-054	Held at USP Lewisburg from 1991 until his deportation to Northern Ireland in 1992.	Provisional Irish Republican Army (IRA) escapee who fought an ultimately unsuccessful nine-year legal battle against extradition and deportation.

=== Political prisoners ===
Inmate Name	Register Number	Photo	Status	Details
George Sylvester Viereck	Unlisted†		Held at USP Lewisburg from 1943 to 1947.	Convicted in 1943 for not registering as a Nazi agent, according to Foreign Agents Registration Act.
Herbert John Burgman	Unlisted†		Held at USP Lewisburg from 1949 to 1952.	Convicted of treason in 1949 for making numerous propaganda broadcasts for the Nazis.
Douglas Chandler	Unlisted†		Held at USP Lewisburg from 1948 to 1963.	Convicted of treason in 1948 for making numerous propaganda broadcasts for the Nazis.
Alger Hiss	Unlisted†		Held at USP Lewisburg from 1950 to 1954.	American lawyer, government official, author, and lecturer; accused of being a Soviet spy and subsequently convicted of perjury in 1950.
Carl Marzani	Unlisted†		Held at USP Lewisburg from 1950 to 1951.	Italian-born American political activist, publisher, OSS and State Department official who concealed his CPUSA while in government.
John Williamson	Unlisted†		Held at USP Lewisburg from 1950 to 1955.	Member of the CPUSA Central Committee.
Bayard Rustin	Unlisted†		Held at USP Lewisburg from 1944 to 1946.	Civil rights activist and socialist.

=== Others ===
Inmate Name	Register Number	Photo	Status	Details
Kirby Logan Archer	79077-004		Serving 5 life sentences	Found adrift on September 24, 2007, in a lifeboat under circumstances that triggered suspicion. He hijacked the fishing charter vessel the Joe Cool and participated in the murders of the vessel's crew.
Joe Biggs	26257-509		Sentenced to a 17-year term; sentence commuted by President Donald Trump on January 21, 2025.	Participant in the January 6 United States Capitol attack
Andrew Caspersen	75827-054		Released on June 26, 2019.	Wall Street swindler
Robert Hansen	80462-011		Held at USP Lewisburg from 1983 until his transfer to state prison in Alaska in 1988.	American serial killer; convicted in 1983 of murdering four women near Anchorage, Alaska; suspected of 15 other murders.
Roy Gardner	Unlisted*		Served several years of a 75-year sentence at USP Atlanta; attempted to escape in 1926.	Notorious bank robber and escape artist; stole over $350,000 in cash and securities from banks and mail trains in 1920 and 1921.
Willie Aikens	01732-031		Released in 2008; served 14 years.	Former Major League Baseball player; convicted in 1994 of selling crack-cocaine.
Christopher Jeburk	09029-021		Currently serving a life sentence. Now at USP Allenwood.	Bank robber and former FBI Ten Most Wanted fugitive; kidnapped bank teller Amy Shaw and her family, then escaped from prison twice before he could be sentenced for his crimes. Several weeks into his sentence, he was transferred here from Leavenworth Federal Penitentiary after a sharp-eyed prison guard caught him trying to escape a third time by hanging on to a laundry truck before it could reach the front gate.
Larry Lawton	52224-004		Released in 2007. Transferred to USP Atlanta and others.	Ex-jewel thief and organized crime member. Lawton now helps and inspires younger people to stay out of prison and change their life path.
Steve Reid	Unlisted†		Held at USP Lewisburg from 1969 to 1971.	American jazz drummer and conscientious objector to the Vietnam War; convicted of draft evasion in 1969.
Malcolm Smith	68381-054		Held at USP Lewisburg from 2015 to 2021.	New York State Senator convicted of public corruption.
Robert Lee Johnson	Unlisted†		Incarcerated at USP Lewisburg in 1965; murdered at USP Lewisburg in 1972.	Johnson was a US Army sergeant and Thompson a US Air Force clerk; convicted of espionage in 1965 for passing classified army documents to the Soviet intelligence agency known as the KGB.
Robert Thompson	Unlisted†		Incarcerated at USP Lewisburg in 1965; released in 1978.	Johnson was a US Army sergeant and Thompson a US Air Force clerk; convicted of espionage in 1965 for passing classified army documents to the Soviet intelligence agency known as the KGB.
Chevie Kehoe	21300-009		Serving a life sentence. Currently at USP Terre Haute.	White supremacist convicted on charges of racketeering, racketeering in aid of murder and robbery conspiracy in connection to the kidnapping, torture and murders of William and Nancy Mueller and their 8-year-old daughter, Sarah Powell. Co-defendant Daniel Lewis Lee was executed for the murders at United States Penitentiary, Terre Haute on July 14, 2020.
Brandon Russell	14777-104		Scheduled for released on November 1, 2041.	Member of the Atomwaffen Division who planned attacks on electric substations in Baltimore.
John Wojtowicz	76456-158		Held at USP Lewisburg from 1973 to 1979.	Bank robber portrayed by Al Pacino in the 1975 film Dog Day Afternoon.
Carl Upchurch	28862-117		Released from custody in 1982.	American activist, author and educator; portrayed by Omar Epps in the 2002 film Conviction.
Wilhelm Reich	Unlisted†		Held at USP Lewisburg from March 1956 until his death in November 1957.	Austrian psychoanalyst; convicted of contempt of court in 1956 for violating Food and Drug Administration regulations.
Franklin Delano Floyd	Unlisted†		Transferred to Union Correctional Institution	Was on death row for murder. Died January 2023.
Samuel Roth	Unlisted†		Released.	American authors convicted of obscenity; their cases were the subjects of landmark Supreme Court rulings on freedom of sexual expression.
Ralph Ginzburg	Unlisted†		Released.	American authors convicted of obscenity; their cases were the subjects of landmark Supreme Court rulings on freedom of sexual expression.
Richard McCoy Jr.	Unlisted		Deceased	American skyjacker who hijacked United Airlines Flight 855, extorted $500,000, and parachuted out the back. Escaped from prison in 1974 by stealing a garbage truck and ramming the gate. McCoy was later killed in a shootout with FBI agents.
Jayme Gordon	98605-038		Released on November 3, 2018, from federal Residential Reentry Management housing in Philadelphia.	American artist who tried to sue DreamWorks claiming to have come up with the idea for Kung Fu Panda, and altered pictures of a story he copyrighted as proof.
Christopher Noel Dorsey	31969-034		Released on September 5, 2023	Rapper from New Orleans.
Bill Omar Carrasquillo	66578-509		Serving a 5.5 year sentence, scheduled for release in 2028	Known as Omi in a Hellcat. Social media influencer and former owner of Gears Reloaded TV service. Serving 5 1/2 years for tax evasion and copyright infringement
Larry Nassar	21504-040		Serving a 60-year federal sentence. Scheduled for release from federal custody on January 30, 2068, after which he will then serve another 40 to 175 years in a Michigan state prison.	Former USA Gymnastics team physician, and Michigan State University professor and clinician, convicted on federal charges relating to the possession of thousands of items of child pornography. Also convicted for sexually assaulting hundreds of underage girls countless times over decades. Transferred here on July 31, 2023, after being stabbed at United States Penitentiary, Coleman a few weeks prior.
Brian David Mitchell	15815-081		Serving two consecutive life sentences.	Former street preacher and pedophile; convicted in 2010 of interstate kidnapping and unlawful transportation of a minor across state lines in connection with the 2002 kidnapping of 14-year-old Elizabeth Smart. Mitchell and Wanda Barzee repeatedly raped and tortured Smart during her captivity and made threats against her family if she escaped. The two also punished her for defending herself and played mind games with her. In conjunction with Mitchell, Barzee was sentenced to 15 years for her part in the kidnapping.

== See also ==
- List of U.S. federal prisons
- Federal Bureau of Prisons
- Incarceration in the United States
