= United States Penitentiary, Tucson =

United States federal prison in Arizona

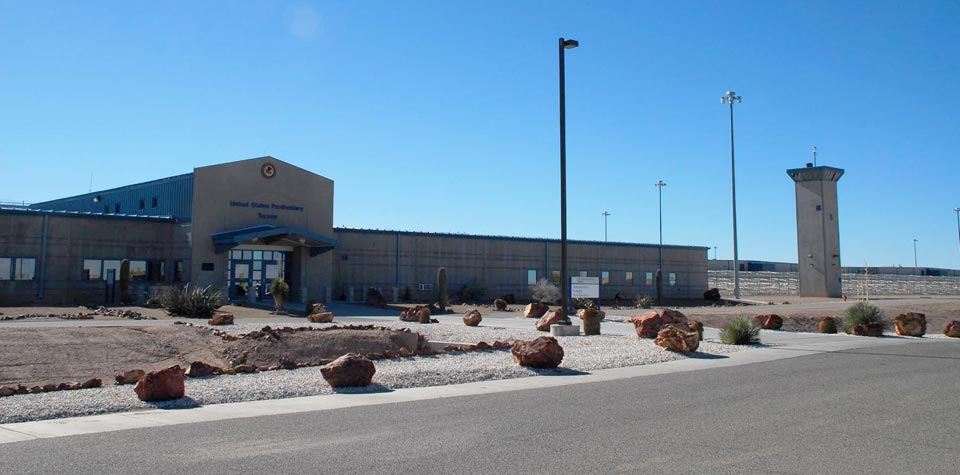
- Interactive map of United States Penitentiary, Tucson
- Location: Tucson, Arizona; 32°5′1″N 110°51′54″W
- Status: Operational
- Security class: High-security (with minimum-security prison camp)
- Population: 1,426 [1,308 at the USP, 118 in prison camp] (September 2023)
- Opened: 2007
- Managed by: Federal Bureau of Prisons

The United States Penitentiary, Tucson (USP Tucson) is a high-security United States federal prison for male inmates in Arizona. It is part of the Tucson Federal Correctional Complex (FCC Tucson) and is operated by the Federal Bureau of Prisons, a division of the United States Department of Justice. The facility also has a satellite prison camp for minimum-security male offenders.

USP Tucson is located within Tucson's city limits, 10 miles (16 km) southeast of downtown Tucson.

== History ==
The Federal Bureau of Prisons drafted a report on March 28, 2001, naming Tucson as an ideal site for a new federal prison housing either 1,100 medium security or 1,000 high security inmates. A hearing was arranged the following May.

Construction was completed in 2005 at a cost of about $100 million, but additional preparations took over a year before inmates could be received. The 584,000-square-foot (54,300 m^{2}) facility is situated on a 640-acre (2.6 km^{2}) property and designed for 1,500 inmates, though officials had at one time planned to limit the population to around 960. The minimum-security work camp provides labor for day-to-day operations of the federal prison complex. It has been described as "its own little city" by Josias Salazar, executive assistant of the prison complex. The opening of the penitentiary on February 5, 2007, worsened a local shortage of prison officers and was cited by residents for adding to the street traffic generated by the various prison facilities.

== Sex Offender Management Program ==
USP Tucson is one of several federal prisons that offers a Sex Offender Management Program (SOMP) and therefore has a higher proportion of sex offenders in its general population. Having a larger number of sex offenders at SOMP facilities ensures that inmates feel safe about participating in treatment. USP Tucson offers a Non-Residential Sex Offender Treatment Program (SOTP-NR), which is a moderate intensity program designed for low to moderate risk sexual offenders. Many of the inmates in the SOTP-NR are first-time offenders serving a sentence for an Internet sex crime. All SOMP institutions offer the SOTP-NR. Eligible inmates are transferred to a SOMP facility based on their treatment needs and security level. USP Tucson houses several high-profile sex offenders.

== Notable incidents ==
The penitentiary went into lockdown on May 28, 2009, after several inmates were hospitalized from fights involving improvised weapons. Another inmate, Joseph William Nichols, was sentenced to 33 more months after being caught on August 12, 2009, with a concealed plastic shank that had been fashioned from his prison chair. A search of the kitchen where Nichols had been assigned resulted in the discovery of hidden contraband packages containing weapons and drug paraphernalia.

== Media coverage ==
In July 2010, a San Diego CityBeat reporter mailed former congressman Randy "Duke" Cunningham to inquire about his time at the prison's work camp halfway into his 100-month sentence for tax evasion, conspiracy to commit bribery, mail fraud and wire fraud. Cunningham, who has become an advocate of prison reform, responded in a handwritten letter that he spends his days there teaching fellow inmates to obtain their GED. He wrote: "[Too] many students have severe learning disabilities from either drugs or genetic[s]. During the past 4 years only one of my students was unable to graduate—I taught him life skills, using a calculator to add, subtract, [multiply and divide]. This way he could at least balance a check book."

== Notable inmates (current and former) ==
- Inmates who were released from custody prior to 1982 are not listed on the Bureau of Prisons website.

=== High-profile ===
Inmate Name	Register Number	Photo	Status	Details
Brian David Mitchell	15815-081		Now at FCI Lewisburg.	Pedophile and former street preacher; convicted in 2010 of interstate kidnapping and sentenced to life imprisonment for unlawful transportation of a minor across state lines for the 2002 abduction of Elizabeth Smart; accomplice Wanda Barzee was sentenced to 15 years.
Gregory Stephen	17502-029		Serving a 180-year sentence, scheduled for release in August 2171	Sentenced to 180 years for secretly collecting pictures of 440 boys and molested more than a dozen boys between 1999 and 2018. He secretly recorded three boys between the ages of 12 and 14 naked in a hotel room. Release date scheduled to be in August 1, 2171.
Steven Dale Green	20848-058		Committed suicide on February 15, 2014, while serving a life sentence	Former U.S. Army Private and war criminal; convicted in 2009 of first degree murder, aggravated sexual abuse, and other charges for raping 14-year-old Abeer Qassim al-Janabi near Mahmoudiya, Iraq and then killing her and her family in 2006.
Toby MacFarlane	74173-298		Served 6-month sentence and released on April 21, 2020	Charged with connection to the 2019 college admissions bribery scandal.
Buster Hernandez	76731-097		Serving a 75-year sentence, schedule for release in 2080	Convicted of child pornography and sextortion charges by inappropriately messaging up to 375 minors as well as threatening mass murder at their schools.
Larry Nassar	21504-040		Transferred to FCI Lewisburg.	Former USA Gymnastics team physician, convicted on federal charges relating to the possession of thousands of items of child pornography.
Jamil Addullah al-Amin	99974-555		Transferred to FMC Butner, passed away November 23, 2025.	Black Power activist. Convicted of murder in Georgia.
Keith Raniere	57005-177		Serving a 120-year sentence, scheduled for release in 2120. Now at FCI Butner.	Founder of the NXIVM cult, convicted in 2019 for 2 counts of sex trafficking, racketeering, forced labor conspiracy, attempted sex trafficking, and wire fraud conspiracy.
Esteban Santiago-Ruiz	15500-104		Serving five life sentences plus 120 years.	Convicted in 2018 for the Fort Lauderdale airport shooting.

=== Political figures ===
Inmate Name	Register Number	Photo	Status	Details
Randy "Duke" Cunningham	94405-198		Released from custody on June 4, 2013; served 7 years.	Former US Congressman (Republican) from California; pleaded guilty in 2005 to accepting $2.4 million in bribes from company owners in return for awarding them contracts to produce military equipment.
Philip Giordano	14302-014		Now at FCI Yazoo City	Mayor of Waterbury (Republican), Connecticut from 1995 to 2001; convicted in 2003 of violating the civil rights of two female minors by forcing them to perform sex acts on him.
Timothy Villagomez	00590-005		Served a 7-year sentence. Released on June 23, 2017.	LT Governor (Republican) of the Northern Mariana Islands, a US territory, from 2006 to 2009; convicted in 2009 of fraud and bribery; highest-ranking official from the Mariana Islands to be convicted .

=== Terrorists ===
Inmate Name	Register Number	Status	Details
Jaan Laaman	10372-016	Released from USP McCreary in May 2021	Member of the United Freedom Front, a Marxist group which carried out robberies and bombings at corporate and governments facilities in the 1970s and early 1980s; convicted in 1985 for his involvement in 10 bombings and attempted bombings in New York.

=== Organized crime figures ===
Inmate Name	Register Number	Photo	Status	Details
William Pickard	82687-011		Sentenced to serve two life sentences. Released on July 27, 2020, after serving 17 years.	Former Deputy Director of the Drug Policy Analysis Program at the University of California, Los Angeles; convicted in 2003 of conspiracy to produce and distribute the drug LSD; Pickard was allegedly the largest supplier of LSD in the United States at the time of his arrest.
Whitey Bulger	02182-748		Served life sentences plus 5 years under his real name, James J. Bulger. Murdered in 2018 upon arrival at USP Hazelton.	Former leader of the Winter Hill Gang in Massachusetts and FBI Ten Most Wanted fugitive; apprehended in 2011 after 16 years on the run; convicted in 2013 of ordering 11 murders, as well as extortion, money laundering and drug trafficking. Transferred in October 2018 to the Federal Transfer Center and then to USP Hazelton, where he was murdered less than 24 hours after arrival.
Anthony Casso	16802-050		Died in custody on December 15, 2020, while serving a 455 year sentence in prison.	American mobster and underboss of the Lucchese crime family. After Casso's arrest in 1993, he agreed to turn informant in 1994. However, in 1998, Casso was thrown out of the witness protection program after prosecutors alleged numerous infractions, in 1997, including bribing guards, assaulting other inmates and making "false statements" about Gravano and D'Arco. Shortly afterward, Judge Block sentenced Casso to 455 years in prison without possibility of parole—the maximum sentence permitted under sentencing guidelines.
Louis Eppolito	04596-748		Died in custody on November 3, 2019, while serving a life sentence.	Former NYPD detective; convicted in 2006 of carrying out murders and sharing law enforcement intelligence disclosing the identities of witnesses for the Lucchese crime family; his partner, Stephen Caracappa, was also sentenced to life.
Ross Ulbricht	18870-111		Pardoned by President Donald Trump on January 21, 2025, after serving two consecutive life sentences plus 40 years.	Convicted in 2015 for operating Silk Road marketplace web site and drug trafficking.
Craig Petties	82553-179		Serving nine life sentences.	Pleaded guilty to 19 charges related to his role as the ringleader of one of the largest drug trafficking organizations ever prosecuted in West Tennessee.

=== Others ===
Inmate Name	Register Number	Photo	Status	Details
Edward Oedewaldt	14701-035		Now at FCI Petersburg	Arrested during the largest child pornography prosecution in US history; pleaded guilty in 2011 to being the system administrator of Dreamboard, a website whose members produced and traded images and videos of adults molesting children.
Ryan Patrick Lane	13107-049		Now at FCI Terre Haute	Convicted for robbing the TD Bank in Hampton, New Hampshire, on April 14, 2013; the Rockland Trust Bank in Hingham, Massachusetts, on March 29, 2013; and the Braintree Cooperative Bank in Quincy, Massachusetts, on April 25, 2013. In each instance, Lane entered the bank and handed the teller a note demanding money and, in the Hampton robbery, threatened to kill the teller if she pushed any alarms. Lane fled the banks on foot after committing the robberies. Transferred to another prison after assaulting Larry Nassar
David Hu	07968-509		Serving a 12-year sentence; scheduled for release in 2031.	Co-founder of IIG Capital who was convicted of running a $100 million ponzi-scheme.

== See also ==
- List of U.S. federal prisons
- Federal Bureau of Prisons
- Incarceration in the United States
- Sex offender registries in the United States
