= Robert Lee Johnson =

Robert Lee Johnson may refer to:

- Bob Johnson (outfielder) (Robert Lee Johnson, 1905–1982), American left fielder in Major League Baseball
- Robert Lee Johnson (spy) (1922–1972), American sergeant who spied for the Soviet Union
