= Nest Egg =

Nest Egg may refer to:

- Operation Nest Egg, a biodiversity program to protect kiwi populations
- Operation Nestegg, a 1944 codename for Task Force 135 in the Channel Islands' liberation from Germany
- Operation Nest Egg, a 2008 international crackdown on child pornography
