= Kevin Rodney Sullivan =

American director (born 1958)

- Born: August 3, 1958 (age 68); San Francisco, California, U.S.
- Occupations: Actor, film director
- Years active: 1979–present

Kevin Rodney Sullivan (born August 3, 1958) is an American film and television actor and film director.

== Early life and acting career ==
Sullivan is a San Francisco native who began his career as a child actor. The youngest of three children, he grew up in St. Francis Square in the Fillmore district. His father was a bus driver, and his mother was a receptionist for St. Mary's Hospital. According to Sullivan, he was "one step up from a housing project".

During sixth grade while performing in A Midsummer Night's Dream, Sullivan's talents were noted by Ann Brebner, who hired him and his entire class as extras in a 1970 Sidney Poitier film, They Call Me Mr. Tibbs!. This was his first experience with cinema. Brebner would continue to give Sullivan various auditions. In 1970, he was cast in an Alpha-Bits Cereal commercial, earning over $7,000. He continued to obtain small roles in theater productions and doing commercials. Most notably, he got a role as the Master of Ceremonies during an episode of Sesame Street being filmed live at Golden Gate Park. He had to "sit on this big garbage can with a microphone and introduce the various skits," with Jim Henson controlling the puppets.

Sullivan was cast in Thumb Tripping with Meg Foster, following which he got a part in a series called Wee Pals on the Go. The series was based on a comic strip by Morrie Turner and featured an integrated neighborhood. He played Randy, "a kid with a big Afro who loved sports," according to Sullivan. For Christmas, the producer gave Sullivan his first 8-millimeter camera with which he first experimented in film.

He acquired a scholarship to St. Ignatius College Preparatory, a Jesuit all-boys high school in the Sunset District of San Francisco and graduated in 1976. "The school had 1,200 boys; only 40 were black," according to Sullivan. Sullivan was challenged in his classwork for the first time; he was also barred from the theater program because of his race. "I felt out of place and no one tried to make me feel otherwise," said Sullivan. At one point, he joined the Young Conservatory of the American Theater in downtown San Francisco. During his senior year, he convinced the theater department to allow him to direct Ceremonies in Dark Old Men, by Lonne Elder; following this, the school asked him to be the lead in a production of The Teahouse of the August Moon.

Due to his acting successes, Sullivan applied to the Juilliard School in New York. John Houseman, who had recently received an Oscar for his role in
The Paper Chase, was his interviewer. Houseman's comments on Sullivan's abilities at the time: "You have talent, but you're only 17 years old. Most of our students come here after four years of college. I don't think you're ready for New York City just yet."

Sullivan ended up at Willamette University in Salem, Oregon, where he was offered a theater scholarship. He applied to be an English major, as he
was growing increasingly interested in writing. "I was a whale in a fishbowl," said Sullivan, who was overqualified for the college's theater program.
He played the lead, Proteus, in Two Gentlemen of Verona, rather than the supporting role for which he had auditioned. Subsequently, Sullivan was in numerous plays and was chosen to direct a production of Slow Dance on the Killing Ground, a play by William Hanley. He decided to produce his own play as an independent study, left Willamette and never went back.

In the summer of 1987, Sullivan headed to Los Angeles. He began by working with a friend and fellow actor in Hollywood and began to write scripts. On one four-day trip to DC, he picked up inspiration for characters from fellow passengers. While his scripts went largely unnoticed, the trip would inspire later works. In the meantime, his acting was noticed after he auditioned for a few movie roles, including Lieutenant in More American Graffiti (1979), Tyrone in Night Shift (1982), March in Star Trek II: The Wrath of Khan (1982), and John Grant in The Adventures of Buckaroo Banzai Across the 8th Dimension (1984).

== Early screenwriting ==
At 22, the first TV script he sold was for an episode of Fame for the ABC network. This connection to ABC allowed him to write the TV drama series Knightwatch in 1988. In 1992, Sullivan directed the pilot for an ABC series, Moe's World, a story narrated by a young boy killed in a car crash. The story "tackled" topics such as teenage pregnancy and death as well as other topics relevant to teenagers. However, while ABC bought the pilot, the show was never picked up. Fox considered purchasing the show but did not follow through.

Despite that minor setback, this background allowed Sullivan to jump into directing movies for HBO: the short film "Long Black Song", which was one of three in the America's Dream (1996) anthology movie, and Soul of the Game (1996). The later was a docudrama on how African Americans "broke the baseball color barrier" which follows the "triumphant and tragic stories" of Jackie Robinson, Satchel Paige, and Josh Gibson as they make their way out of the Negro leagues, and into the Majors. "For African-Americans in this century," Sullivan told The New York Times regarding Soul of the Game, "one man's victory is often the result of others paving the way, sometimes making the triumph both bitter and sweet". The film was eventually pulled and is no longer available on TV.

Sullivan's successes presented him with many opportunities, including the ability to collaborate with George Lucas on Red Tails, a story about the Tuskegee airmen, as well as with Norman Jewison on an adaptation of The Good Times Are Killing Me. In addition to these series, Sullivan also produced Frank's Place (1987), I'll Fly Away (1991), Boy Meets Girl (1993), and Cosmic Slop (1994), before his first major production.

== Major film productions ==
The movie How Stella Got Her Groove Back (1998) swept the NAACP Image Awards, won the award for Outstanding Picture and was Kevin Rodney Sullivan's Hollywood directorial debut. The movie was based on a popular novel at the time, and follows the story of Stella (played by Angela Bassett) who is a single mother of one who finds love in Jamaica with a man much younger than her named Winston (played by Taye Diggs). It also had other notable stars such as Whoopi Goldberg, who plays Stella's best friend. The film, while not the first to use a tropic paradise as its background, "may be the first to blatantly portray a tropical paradise as a sexual mecca beckoning tired American businesswomen to shed their clothes and inhibitions," according to a The New York Times review. Despite some mixed reviews, Sullivan still "provides a movie that speaks in a recognizable way to a black audience, particularly black women who have found themselves omitted from serious screen depiction over the decades".

Sullivan's next major production was Conviction (2002), based on the autobiography of Carl Upchurch entitled Convicted in the Womb. The movie wrestles with race relations and issues pertaining to jail and gang violence, as well as the use of anti-Black language. After being reformed in jail, the main character goes on a mission to help reduce youth violence by inviting the leaders of the largest gangs to a church meeting. Upchurch had a cameo as a jail guard.

Sullivan then produced Barbershop 2: Back in Business (2004), a sequel to Barbershop (2002). The original cast returned with some additions. Notable cast members included Ice Cube, Cedric the Entertainer, Anthony Anderson, and a brief cameo by Queen Latifah in promotion of her spinoff of the Barbershop franchise.

The latest major film production by Kevin Sullivan was Guess Who (2005); the idea for the movie was originally a collaborative effort by Ashton Kutcher and Bernie Mac. As Kutcher explained in an interview about his choice of directors, "I had a conversation with Kevin before we started the movie. And the reason that I liked Kevin - we picked Kevin to do the movie, Bernie and I did, because what he knew the movie needed was heart. And he was more concerned about the heart than the comedy". The movie focuses on a young white man (played by Kutcher) attempting to marry an African American woman, while trying to seek the approval of her overprotective father (played by Bernie Mac). Working with Sullivan did have its impact upon the film, as Kutcher explains, "Well, working for Kevin Sullivan was a very different experience for me. Kevin didn't just let us go. At no point in time did Kevin just let us go... And I think that that brought a different performance for each of us from what we'd done before". The movie received mostly mixed reviews.

== Recent screenwriting ==
In the four years between How Stella Got Her Groove Back and Conviction, Sullivan wrote and collaborated with the producers of The West Wing (2000), which followed a fictional White House staff about on various fictional activities.

Sullivan then developed a pilot for the series Watching Ellie (2002), and wrote some scripts for The Guardian (2002) which was a crime drama that ran for two seasons.

Following the release of Conviction, he began working on scripts for The Henry Lee Project (2003). This series followed a veteran policeman turned private detective. The part of the policeman was played by notable actor Danny Glover.

The most notable of his recent screenplays is 30 Rock (2008), which has received national acclaim and many awards including Emmy awards for Outstanding Comedy Series in 2007, 2008 and 2009. The show was renewed by NBC for a sixth season in 2010. Tina Fey was the original project writer, and created the storyline to be based on her own life story. Sullivan collaborated with three other producers, including Alec Baldwin on this show, especially on the second season. However, despite winning awards for being an outstanding comedy, 30 Rock has been chronically underrated throughout its six seasons of being on air, with a viewership of nearly 5.3 million viewers.

== Filmography ==
=== Acting credits ===
- More American Graffiti (1979) - Lieutenant
- Star Trek II: The Wrath of Khan (1982) - March
- Night Shift (1982) - Tyrone
- The Facts of Life (1983, TV series) - Marshall Ramsey
- The Adventures of Buckaroo Banzai Across the 8th Dimension (1984) - John Gant
- Happy Days (1980–1984) - Tommy

=== Directing credits ===
TV series

- Frank's Place (1987)
- Knightwatch (1988)
- I'll Fly Away (1991)
- The West Wing (2000)
- Watching Ellie (2002)
- The Guardian (2002)
- The Henry Lee Project (2003, TV Series) known as The Law and Mr. Lee, unaired pilot for CBS
- 30 Rock (2008)
- Lincoln Heights (2009)
- Eastwick (2010)
- Modern Family (2010)
- NCIS (2011)
- Anger Management (2013)
- Grey's Anatomy (2016–18)
- How to Get Away with Murder (2016)
- Notorious (2016)
- Being Mary Jane (2017)
- Dynasty (2017)
- Quantico (2018)
- Riverdale (2017–23)
- The Good Fight (2018–19)
- Titans (2018–19)
- You (2019)
- Evil (2019-20)
- Chilling Adventures of Sabrina (2019–20)
- This Is Us (2021)
- Love, Victor (2021)
- Atypical (2021)
- Lost in Space (2021)
- Snowfall (2022)
- Surface (2022)
- Justified: City Primeval (2023)
- Elsbeth (2024)
- Unprisoned (2024)
- Brilliant Minds (2026)

Feature film

- Moe's World (1990)
- Boy Meets Girl (1993)
- Cosmic Slop (1994)
- America's Dream (1996)
- Soul of the Game (1996)
- How Stella Got Her Groove Back (1998)
- Conviction (2002)
- Barbershop 2: Back in Business (2004; also executive soundtrack producer)
- Guess Who (2005)
- Rise (TBD, film)
