= Donato Di Camillo =

American photographer and documentarian

Donato Di Camillo is an American photographer and video documentarian, best known for his New York City street photography and documentary portraits of the fringe and underdog populations of the United States. His work has been celebrated around the world and featured in publications including American Photo magazine, Stern and Amateur Photographer.

Di Camillo rose to prominence as a street photographer quickly, within four years of his first photographic activity. His work has been compared favorably to that of his influences, including Bruce Gilden, Robert Frank and Diane Arbus (other stated influences include Richard Avedon, Sally Mann, Martin Parr and Garry Winogrand). Priscilla Frank wrote in the Huffington Post: "The photographer remains committed to capturing people on the fringes of society, those that often remain unseen or, even worse, deliberately ignored. The sharp and colorful images linger on every single sloppy detail, translating the ugly beauty of being a human being into intoxicating images that, like a shot of hard booze, will burn in a good way."

His photo essay blog, Faces & Places, appears weekly in The Common Reader, a publication of Washington University in St. Louis.

== Background ==
Born in Brooklyn, New York, Di Camillo became intensely interested in photography while serving out a federal prison sentence in Federal Correctional Institution, Petersburg in Hopewell County, Virginia. After his release in 2012, he taught himself to use a camera while under home confinement. At first, he photographed, bugs, plants and other subjects within the 120 feet of the home he was restricted to. Upon gaining his freedom, he turned his lens toward people. In part due to his sensational backstory, he and his work were soon featured in publications and news broadcasts around the world, including the BBC, Washington Post, and Huffington Post. He was also invited to speak at the Hearst magazines annual summit.

== Beach Body Bingo ==
Di Camillo received international attention for his Beach Body Bingo project, focused on the community on and around the famed boardwalk in Coney Island, N.Y.

== Projects, exhibits and commissions ==
Di Camillo's Coney Island portraits were featured in the group exhibit, Greetings from Coney Island, which ran from June through September 2018 in the Hon. Charles P. Sifton Gallery of the U.S. Eastern District Courthouse in Brooklyn, the same building in which, years earlier, he had been convicted and sent to prison.

In October, 2019, he was invited back to the gallery for his first solo exhibition. Full Circle was a critical success and drew wide attention to Di Camillo's work.

His work was featured in the 2018 Perugia Social Photo Fest in Perugia, Italy.

Di Camillo was commissioned to photograph the denizens of Louisiana in November 2016. His subjects included descendants of slaves, the Lake Charles SWAT team and a leader of the United Daughters of The Confederacy. The following year, he carried out a similar project in Cuba.

In February 2019, Di Camillo received international attention for his portraits and exposure of the homeless community in affluent Cape May County, N.J.

That same month, Di Camillo's work was featured in The O.G. Experience, an art exhibit in Manhattan, inspired by and sponsored by HBO Films' drama, O.G.. The art on display was created by artists who were formerly incarcerated in the U.S. prison system.

Di Camillo shared a collaborative exhibition and panel discussion with internationally acclaimed fashion, fine art and documentary photographer Jamel Shabazz at the Photoville festival in Brooklyn in September 2019.

Di Camillo conducts workshops in New York City and other cities (including Havana). He currently resides in Staten Island, NY.

== COVID-19 photography ==
Di Camillo was a primary photographic and video documentarian of the COVID-19 pandemic lockdown in New York City. He is credited with exposing the overflow conditions in funeral homes caused by the crisis. The exclusive photo exposé, written with John Griswold, was published in the Common Reader in April 2020.

== Awards ==
Di Camillo was listed among LensCulture magazine's 100 Top Street Photographers Awards of 2016 (in its international competition among artists in 141 countries) and a finalist in its 2018 Portrait Awards.
