= Craig Petties =

American criminal (born 1976)

- Born: December 11, 1976 (age 49); Memphis, Tennessee, U.S.
- Other names: Lil' C, Lil' Dude
- Occupation: Druglord
- Spouse: Latosha Booker
- Convictions: Murder in aid of racketeering, conspiracy to commit murder for hire
- Penalty: Life imprisonment without parole

Craig Petties (born December 11, 1976) is an American convicted drug trafficker best known for the criminal empire he led in Memphis, Tennessee, from the mid-1990s to 2008, and for his connections to the Mexican drug cartel. The organization's prosecution was later described as the largest drug case in Memphis federal court history. Petties was sentenced to life in prison in 2013 at the age of 36.

== Early life ==
Craig Petties was born in 1976 to Ever Jean Petties in Memphis, Tennessee, growing up with his sister at 263 West Dison Avenue in the impoverished Riverside neighborhood. The family lived in a tiny brick home his mother bought for US$17,000. His half-brother Paul Beauregard (better known as DJ Paul) was born 32 days after Petties in South Memphis and shared the same father—whose identity is unpublished. Petties' mother made a little over US$15,000 annually serving as a foster parent and working in some capacity for the board of education in the Shelby County school system.

The area was a well-known haven for drug dealers, and Petties began selling small amounts of drugs in the late 1980s when the crack cocaine epidemic was spreading to the Southeastern United States. He was given the nickname Lil' C because of his short stature.

Petties was first arrested in 1992 at age 15 during his first year at Carver High School. He was caught possessing a sawed-off shotgun which he purchased to intimidate individuals who had stolen his coat. He accidentally discharged the gun inside his home, and was the person who called police to explain himself. Petties dropped out of school by age 16 and was arrested three more times, twice for selling crack during the summer of 1993 and once during the winter for attempted murder. He and some cohorts had approached a rival named Eric Cole and started shooting, with Cole surviving after being shot in the back. Authorities recommended trying Petties as an adult, a crime that is punishable by a sentence of up to 20 years, but the adult court declined and sent the case back to juvenile court.

In October of that year between the second and third arrests, psychologist Robert Parr evaluated Petties. He described the young man as polite, standing only five feet five inches (165 cm) tall, weighing 130 pounds (59 kg), and having a low verbal IQ of 77. Petties eventually stopped growing at five feet nine inches (175 cm). Dr. Parr identified negativism, rebelliousness, a lack of impulse control, and resentment of authority.

== Adulthood ==
By 1995, Petties was 18 and making decent money dealing drugs. An acquaintance known to Petties and his cousin Antonio Allen had become the top dealer in South Memphis. That man was arrested in March 1995 and his Chevrolet Lumina was impounded with US$500,000 cash hidden in a secret compartment. The jailed dealer called Allen and offered him a cut if he could retrieve the money before law enforcement found it. Allen, known as "Big Wayne", was too heavy to climb a ladder over a fence, so he recruited the smaller Petties to complete the mission. After Petties recovered the cache, the group double-crossed the car's owner by keeping the money and splitting it among friends, with Petties keeping US$50,000 for himself. Petties bought a Cadillac and gave some money to his mother to have an aging tree removed from their property.

Petties invested the remainder of the money by purchasing large quantities of drugs to jumpstart his illegal business and then reinvested the profits buying more drugs. He quickly outsold all other local dealers and ascended to the leadership of the Memphis branch of the Gangster Disciples. Petties grew the criminal enterprise into one of the largest and most violent drug trafficking rings in the history of West Tennessee, if not the largest. Around this time, Petties met cousins Clinton and Martin Lewis, two men who became his most loyal cohorts. Clinton, nicknamed "Goldie", was 18 at the time while Martin, nicknamed "M", was 20.

Petties was arrested as an adult for the first time at age 21 in 1998 after pleading guilty to burglarizing boxcars in Memphis rail yards. As evidence of his success, Petties was only 22 when he bought a house in the middle-class suburb of Hickory Hill during the summer of 1999 for US$185,000, quickly paying off the entire debt. He purchased a Bentley for US$339,000, a Mercedes-Benz for US$112,000, and property in Las Vegas.

== Expanding beyond Tennessee ==
At 23, Petties bought 200 pounds (91 kg) of marijuana and 22 pounds (10.0 kg) of cocaine through middlemen with direct connections to Mexico. Large amounts of cash from the drug sales were stored on various premises in West Tennessee and eventually funneled back to Texas and Mexico. By 2000, the trafficking operation had grown significantly. Petties coordinated efforts with cocaine and marijuana traffickers to prepare and package the drugs in at least eight states including Alabama, Arkansas, Georgia, Mississippi, Missouri, North Carolina, and Texas. After this success, Petties was introduced to drug lord Edgar Valdez Villareal in Corpus Christi, Texas. At the time, Valdez was a high-ranking leader in Mexico's Beltrán-Leyva Cartel. The connection was cited in law enforcement circles as the first time a black American was accepted by any Mexican cartel. With this more powerful association, Petties grew his organization much larger and became a multimillionaire in his mid-20s.

The majority of marijuana and cocaine smuggled from Mexico to Memphis by any organization typically arrived in hidden compartments on tractor-trailers via interstates I-55 and I-40. Shipments of drugs varied from 330 to 1,100 pounds (150 to 500 kilograms), but one shipment totaled 5,500 pounds (2,500 kg) with a street value of US$50 million. Some drug packages were even mailed via FedEx.

Petties was reportedly making the group millions of dollars every week. The organization also supplied millions of dollars in cocaine to the Black Mafia Family drug ring founded in Detroit. Domination of the Memphis drug trade was furthered by intimidation as Petties and his cohorts killed at least six people.

== Fugitive status ==
On April 4, 2001, Petties' girlfriend Latosha Booker called police after fighting in the home of an acquaintance. When officers arrived, they smelled and searched the home, discovering three duffel bags of marijuana totaling 650 pounds (290 kg). Petties and others in the home were arrested and his bond was set at US$250,000, an amount Petties easily paid. Charges were eventually dropped for unknown reasons.

During the summer of 2002 in the Memphis suburb of Bartlett, officers discovered 84 pounds (38 kg) of cocaine with a street value of nearly US$1 million hidden in the attic of a home linked to the organization. That discovery led to an indictment of Petties by the federal government in November. Special agents for the DEA correctly surmised that Petties and his associates had become the predominant suppliers of marijuana and cocaine in Memphis.

In response to the indictment, Petties fled to Mexico. Each time Mexican authorities closed in on Petties, corrupt officials tipped him off, including one such warning from an employee of the U.S. Embassy in Mexico, causing Petties to move to a different city. He eventually settled in the Mexican state of Querétaro a few hours north of Mexico City, buying a home in the upscale Milenio III subdivision of Santiago de Querétaro, Mexico.

In August 2004, he was added to the U.S. Marshals 15 Most Wanted Fugitives list and featured on the television series America's Most Wanted. But it wasn't until 2007 that authorities knew Petties was hiding south of the border. In Mexico, Petties was protected by the Mexican cartel where he had a private driver, a personal chef, a maid, a nanny, a personal trainer, and armed guards. From there, he was still able to orchestrate homicides back in the United States and organize the illegal transportation of over a ton (900 kg) of marijuana and hundreds of kilos of cocaine from Mexico back into Tennessee and other states. The Lewis cousins ran operations in the United States on behalf of Petties, traveling to Mexico, arranging deliveries, purchasing stash houses, and protecting Petties' mother.

== Select homicides ==
Friends of Petties noticed his desire for revenge after he fled to Mexico, inspired by the Mexican drug cartels' propensity for violent redemption against rivals and informants. Having only ordered one murder before fleeing the country, Petties coordinated the murders of another five people while calling in orders from abroad, disguising his voice over the phone in case of wiretapping by authorities. Police believe the death toll linked to Petties' organization is even higher than six.

=== The murder of Antonio Allen ===
In 2002, Petties gave orders to kill his own cousin Antonio Allen by offering an associate Tobias Pride US$100,000, despite Allen being a friend of Pride's for 16 years. Allen's cooperation with law enforcement was discovered when Geraldine Galloway, the president of a local bail bond company, told Petties that Allen was providing police information. On April 21, 2002, Allen opened the door to his Buick at his residence when he was ambushed by his friend Pride. He had been hiding behind a bush and approached Allen firing guns in both hands. After dumping the murder weapons, Pride returned to the scene to verify Allen's death.

=== The murders of Latrell Small and Kalonji Griffin ===
In 2004, Petties' hitman Clarence Broady, nicknamed "Killer", was ordered to kill Latrell Small (32) who had dressed as a police officer and robbed a member of Petties' organization. Broady contacted Small under the ruse of planning a robbery together, and Small brought an accomplice Kalonji Griffin (25). Broady met them at an apartment complex in the Hickory Hill neighborhood, jumped in the back seat of Small's car, and shot both in the back of the head (Small as ordered and Griffin for being a witness).

=== The murder of Mario Stewart ===
Mario Stewart (28) cooperated with police after a drug possession arrest, and even recorded a conversation during which Tobias Pride confessed to the 2002 Allen murder. As Stewart continued secretly recording the conversation, Pride confessed that Petties ordered his death and even admitted that he stood in Stewart's backyard one night to commit the murder, only backing down because of their friendship. In 2005, Broady was assigned to kill Stewart for US$50,000 after Pride refused. That March, Demetrius Fields drove Broady to Stewart's suburban home on Callaway Hills Drive, where he waited in the garage and fatally shot Stewart with his children inside.

=== The murder of Marcus Turner ===
On September 27, 2006, the naked body of Marcus Turner (30) was dumped in a ditch along State Line Road in Olive Branch, Mississippi, just across the border from Memphis. Petties had ordered his kidnapping and torture in search of information on Bobby Craft who stole 440 pounds (200 kg) of cocaine from the group worth millions of dollars that Craft was in charge of guarding. Craft was chased by the Lewis cousins who descended on his house, initiated a shootout, and engaged in a high-speed car chase into Arkansas where Craft was also hunted by Clarence Broady to no avail. The group thought Turner knew of Craft's whereabouts, and he was tortured for three days at different houses around Memphis. Kidnappers included Broady, the Lewis cousins, Demetrius "Meat" Fields, Marcus "White Boy" Brandon, and Carlos "Lizard" Whitelow. Gang members finally believed Turner when he indicated he did not know where Craft was hiding but killed him anyway before dumping his body.

=== The murder of Mario McNeil ===
In 2007, Mario Lashon McNeil (33) threatened Petties' mother in response to the Turner homicide, so Petties ordered his murder. On March 16, McNeil was spotted at Divine Wings & Bar in Hickory Hill at 3279 Kirby Parkway. After being contacted and driven to the restaurant, Martin Lewis entered the establishment and fatally shot McNeil after Carlos Whitelow told him over the phone what McNeil was wearing.

== Capture and confession ==
The Lewis cousins were arrested in 2007. Five years after fleeing to Mexico, Petties, at age 31 was captured in Santiago de Querétaro, Mexico, on January 10, 2008. Snipers, Mexican military, and police officers descended on his white stucco home with helicopters overhead, a residence he shared with his wife Latosha Booker and their five children. His 17 years as the leader of a criminal organization had come to an end. Petties was deported and U.S. federal agents arrested the fugitive in Houston. Petties wouldn't confess any details of his empire at first. But authorities told him his three youngest children under the age of five - all born in Mexico under fake names - wouldn't be allowed by Mexican border agents to enter the United States. They made a deal to extract extensive information from Petties in exchange for the immigration of his children, details that are hidden in sealed court records.

Petties was held in the Federal Correctional Institution in Memphis. Prosecutors interrogated Petties for information, offering to change his name in prison and place his family in the witness protection program. Petties knew that wouldn't fend off the Sinaloa Cartel and responded, "Wherever you put me, they'll kill me."

In December 2009, Petties secretly pleaded guilty to 19 charges including drug trafficking, racketeering, money laundering, and orchestrating four of the homicides. The plea would not be disclosed to the public until February 2011.

During a court appearance, in December 2010, Petties pleaded guilty to having a shank hidden in his prison cell mattress. That caused his brief relocation to a federal unit in Tallahassee, Florida, before he was returned to Memphis. He was subsequently moved to the federal facility in Atlanta before being transferred on September 11, 2012, to the Metropolitan Correctional Center in New York City.

=== Indictment ===
A 50-count federal indictment attributed conspiracy in six homicides and racketeering charges to Petties to which he initially pleaded not guilty. Federal prosecutors filed indictments under the RICO Act, often used to prosecute the Mafia, and pushed Petties' associates to testify to avoid stiff sentences of life in prison.

== Trial ==
The trial was scheduled for September 21, 2012, but postponed until November 19. Petties faced the death penalty for coordinating six homicides and life imprisonment for numerous racketeering charges.

=== Conviction ===
On August 22, 2013, United States district court Judge Samuel H. Mays Jr. sentenced Petties to nine life sentences in federal prison without the possibility of parole. U.S. Attorney Edward L. Stanton III, a lifelong resident of Memphis, made the announcement. In a brief statement to families of the victims, Petties indicated remorse for the deaths he'd ordered and stated, "I apologize for the decisions I made in life."

== Sentences for co-conspirators ==
During many of the trials, only defense attorneys and federal prosecutors were permitted to know the identity of the jury for fear of retribution by either Petties associates or the Mexican drug cartel. Petties was the last of 40 individuals convicted in this sweeping investigation, with roughly 30 receiving significant sentences.

On January 3, 2013, Clarence Broady was sentenced to 31 years. Demetrius Fields was sentenced to 37 years on February 1, 2013. Cousins Clinton and Martin Lewis were given life imprisonment without the possibility of parole on May 14, 2013.

Mexican drug lord Edgar Valdez Villarreal was given a 49-year sentence in 2018.

== Imprisonment ==
Petties' cooperation with authorities did not diminish his sentence, but it did inspire Judge Mays to honor a request to place Petties in a prison near Memphis so that his elderly mother, wife, and children could visit. However, as of 2023, Petties is now held at the U.S. Penitentiary in Tucson, Arizona as inmate number 82553-179.
