= Kingsley Ofosu =

Ghanaian stowaway (born 1970)

Kingsley Ofosu (born 1970) is a Ghanaian who made international news in 1992, when he survived the slaughter of a group of African stowaways by the crew of the Bahamian-flagged cargo ship MC Ruby. In all, eight men were killed, including Ofosu's brother. Ofosu was the only survivor.

Ofosu's ordeal was dramatized in the 1996 feature film Deadly Voyage, produced by Union Pictures for distribution to the British Broadcasting Corporation (BBC) and Home Box Office (HBO). The film starred Omar Epps as Ofosu.

== Early life ==
Born in Ghana in 1970, Kingsley Ofosu was the eldest of four children and left school early to help his mother make a living selling produce. He had wanted to become an automotive engineer, but lacked the money to pursue the necessary studies in that field. Instead, as a young man, he found intermittent work on the docks in the port of Takoradi.

== Stowing away ==
=== Voyage ===
According to Ofosu, he and seven other Ghanaians, including his half-brother Albert Codjoe, stowed away aboard the MC Ruby, a Bahamian-flagged, Ukrainian-crewed cargo ship, on 24 October 1992. The ship was docked in Takoradi, taking on a load of cocoa. The stowaways had wanted to travel to Europe, where each man had hoped to find a more prosperous life than what was available to them in Ghana. Ofosu specifically had hoped to pursue his studies so that he could return to Ghana as a trained engineer. After hiding within the ship's holds, the group discovered another stowaway, not previously known to them, who had boarded the ship at its previous stop in Douala, Cameroon.

Six days into the voyage, the group's water container was broken, forcing them to begin ferreting about the ship in search of more. This resulted in them being discovered by the ship's crew. Members of the ship's crew took all of the group's money and then confined them in the compartment containing the ship's anchor chain. They were held there for three days, being given no food and little water. Eventually, the six crew members began removing the group two to three at time. Although they told the men that they were being moved to a more comfortable accommodation, the crew in fact had decided to murder the men, beating them with an iron bar and shooting them, then finally throwing them overboard somewhere off the coast of Portugal. It was later determined that the crew members' motive was to avoid the heavy fine they would have faced for bringing illegal immigrants into a Western port.

Ofosu and Codjoe were the last two to be removed from the compartment. As they were brought out, they noticed the blood on the crewmen's clothing and surmised what was about to occur. They attempted to break away, but Codjoe was shot and thrown overboard. Ofosu successfully escaped back into the bowels of the ship and went back into hiding, successfully eluding the crew's searches for him for three days until the ship reached port in Le Havre, France.

=== Investigation and trial ===
Upon the arrival in Le Havre, Ofosu slipped off of the ship and made his way to a police station, where he reported to the authorities what had occurred during the voyage. Prior to leaving the ship, he had left his Ghanaian identification papers in one of the ship's cocoa sacks, providing evidence of the truth of his story once it was found. Human excrement found in the cargo hold also provided corroboration that other stowaways had originally been aboard.

Four of the crew members soon confessed to the crimes and six were later tried in Rouen. Defense attorneys disputed some of the details of Ofosu's story, noting that searches failed to turn up the money he claimed had been taken by the crew. They also argued that he might have misidentified specific crew members and that the Cameroonian stowaway had jumped into the sea shortly after the group's discovery. But the core of the remainder of Ofosu's narrative went largely unchallenged, with two crew members explicitly acknowledging their culpability and identifying the ship's first mate, Valery Artemenko, as the one who gave the order to kill the men. The ship's captain, Vladimir Ilnitskiy, testified that he had not ordered the murders but acknowledged that he had also done nothing to stop them. Outside of the six men arrested, the remaining crew members said they had known nothing of the stowaways.

In the end, five members of the crew were convicted, with Ilnitskiy and Artemenko each receiving a life sentence in prison. Three other crew members, Oleg Mikhailevsky, Petr Bondarenko and Sergei Romashenko, each received a 20-year sentence. Prior to the trial, Ofosu had expressed some disappointment that French law would not permit the imposition of a death sentence upon the crew members. The sixth crew member who went to trial, Georgian Dzhamal Arakhamiya, insisted that he had refused to participate in the murders. Ofosu did not specifically identify Arakhamiya as one of the culprits and he was acquitted.

French harbor police noted that Ofosu's story was unusual only in that he survived, but not in the murderous actions of the MC Ruby's crew, as there was no way to know how many other crews had committed similar killings without being caught. A devout Christian, Ofosu attributed his unlikely survival to Divine Providence.

== Life in France ==
Ofosu settled in France and had hoped to have his pregnant wife come from Ghana to join him, but was never able to find gainful employment in France, a prerequisite for his family to legally immigrate there. He did, however, strike a deal with Union Pictures for the motion picture rights to his story. The infusion of cash he received from that deal allowed him to sustain himself in France despite his lack of steady employment. For a time, he was enrolled in college studying civil engineering and learning French. However, his studies were not completed and he remained unable to find anything but low-wage employment.

Eventually, Ofosu put all of his remaining money into a business venture whose goal was to purchase second-hand electrical goods in France and then sell them at a profit in Ghana. After an initial success, his partnerships in Ghana soured and the business failed.

== Return to Ghana ==
As of 2007, Ofosu was once again living in Ghana with his wife and four children, his impoverished lifestyle not substantially different from the one he had attempted to escape in 1992.

== Funds possibly owed ==
According to Ofosu, his deal with Union Pictures entitled him to 1.5 percent of the film's operating budget and 10% of its net profits. He received an initial check for $67,500 based upon an estimate of the film's expected budget. But in 2007, he said he had never received a final accounting of the actual budget to be able to determine whether he may be owed more. He had also received nothing by way of a share of any net profits.

Ofosu said that Union Pictures' representatives told him that since HBO and the BBC were the ones which funded the film, the needed figures would have to come from those two entities. Ofosu said that neither of the two companies had responded to his inquiries. Union Pictures has since gone bankrupt, but its former head, Bradley Adams, said that he also had tried to get the figures from HBO and the BBC but was unable to make progress. Adams said that he also has seen no net profits from the film.

In 1995, at the end of the trial of the ship's crew, French courts had also ordered €100,000 in compensation to be paid to Ofosu. As of 2007, Ofosu said that he had seen none of these funds either, with all of his efforts to pursue the matter with the French Ministry of Justice having been rebuffed.

== See also ==
- Maersk Dubai incident
