= Deadly Voyage =

1996 television film

- Written by: Stuart Urban
- Directed by: John Mackenzie
- Starring: Omar Epps; Joss Ackland; Sean Pertwee; David Suchet; David Dontoh; Adewale Akinnuoye-Agbaje
- Countries of origin: United Kingdom; United States
- Original language: English

Production
- Producers: Bradley Adams; John Goldschmidt
- Running time: 90 minutes
- Production company: HBO NYC Productions

Original release
- Network: HBO
- Release: 15 June 1996

Deadly Voyage is a 1996 television film directed by John Mackenzie and written by Stuart Urban. Produced by Union Pictures and John Goldschmidt's Viva Films for joint distribution to BBC Films and HBO.

== Plot ==
Aboard the cargo ship MC Ruby, docked in New York City, six stowaways burst from one of the containers being unloaded. They flee from the ship, but are apprehended by dock workers and the New York police. The MC Ruby's Ukrainian crew watches the detention with some amusement, but the ship's captain and his first mate, Ion Plesin, are displeased, aware that the illegal immigrants will cost the shipping company hundreds of thousands of dollars in fines. In response, company representative Andreas Vlachos arrives to oversee future operations and warn that the crew will be liable for any more such fines.

Later, the MC Ruby is docked in Ghana, where dock worker Kingsley Ofosu plans to some day stow away aboard a cargo ship to pursue a better life for himself and his pregnant wife in the United States. Upon winning a lottery, he decides that the time is right, as he can use the money to get on his feet upon his arrival. Ofosu, his brother and six other men slip aboard the MC Ruby and hide in its cargo holds. With the ship behind schedule, Plesin has only one hour to conduct a stowaway search prior to departure. The hasty endeavour fails to turn up Ofosu's group and the ship sails, bound for France, prior to sailing on to New York.

Ofosu's group encounters another stowaway, who had boarded the ship in Cameroon. The men jovially discuss the vocations they intend to pursue in the United States. Later, their water container breaks, forcing them to leave the cargo area to forage for water. They leave evidence of their presence, which the crew discovers. To prevent Vlachos from learning that the stowaway search had failed, the captain has Plesin assemble a small team to conduct a secret search.

The search finds the stowaways and Plesin discusses the predicament with the captain. Given the illegal immigrant fines, they cannot bring the stowaways into port. However, they also cannot alter course to drop the men off somewhere, as Vlachos would then find out about them. Plesin and his small search team hide the Africans in the ship's anchor hold without food or water. When they object, they find Plesin unsympathetic to their desire to escape poverty. He points out that if the stowaways' presence becomes known, he and his men will be fired, and any other jobs they can find in Ukraine will pay even less than the meager wages earned by Ofosu on the docks in Ghana. Yuri, one of Plesin's men, takes pity and secretly delivers them a little water, but he is powerless to do more. As the stowaways suffer, Ofosu laments that he has led the group to their deaths.

The captain acquiesces to Plesin's plan to kill the stowaways. Plesin's team takes the men from the hold in small groups. The team brings each group to another area, murders the men, and throws their bodies overboard. Yuri tries to stop the massacre, but the others overpower and subdue him. Ofosu and his brother are the last two to be brought out, but they surmise what is about to occur and make a run for it, heading in different directions. As they do, Plesin's team shoots Ofosu's brother, catches him and throws him overboard as Ofosu watches. Ofosu flees to the main cargo hold to hide and is able to elude further searches for him. While in the cargo hold, Ofosu stashes a picture of himself and his wife inside one of the cocoa sacks.

Plesin's men are concerned about their inability to locate the final stowaway, but they reason that all Western countries despise black immigrants and thus no one will be motivated to take action against them. They also expect to be able to secure him upon reaching port when he tries to exit the ship. However, once the ship docks, Ofosu is able to escape to shore and make it to the police before Plesin's men can catch him.

The next day, French authorities board the MC Ruby to investigate Ofosu's story. Plesin first denies that there had been any stowaway, but the authorities search the ship's hold and find Ofosu's picture in the cocoa sack. Plesin's final play is to acknowledge the killings but to suggest that he and his men had done France a favour by preventing undesirable blacks from entering the country illegally. The police are unimpressed by this rationale and immediately arrest Plesin and his men, along with the captain.

The film ends with Ofosu on the phone with his wife, hearing the cries of his newborn son, whom he pledges to name after his brother. An epilogue notes that the captain and first mate were convicted of murder and sentenced to life imprisonment. Three other crew members were also convicted and received 20-year sentences, while one crew member was acquitted. Kingsley Ofosu was living in France and hoping to have his wife and child join him.

== Cast ==
- Omar Epps as Kingsley Ofosu
- Joss Ackland as Ship's Captain
- Sean Pertwee as Ion Plesin
- David Suchet as Andreas Vlachos
- David Dontoh as Bob
- Oscar Provencal as Charles
- Juliet Asante as Albert's Wife

(US) Peace Corps volunteers in Ghana were recruited as extras to play the ship's crew members, although many of these scenes do not appear in the final production.

== Production ==
When the trial of the crew members made international headlines, multiple film companies approached Ofosu to purchase the rights to his story. He eventually struck a deal with Union Pictures and Viva Films. The Union Pictures/Viva Films production was to be distributed to and financed by HBO and the BBC.

The screenplay for Deadly Voyage was written by Stuart Urban, who used interviews with Ofosu as his primary source material. Urban was also originally slated to direct, but when he took ill, John Mackenzie was brought in to replace him. The movie was filmed in England and in Ghana.

Producer John Goldschmidt noted that the Ghana portion of the shoot was particularly challenging, with weather that was extremely hot and humid and multiple crew members coming down with malaria or dysentery. There were also many logistical problems, as Ghana lacked an infrastructure conducive to executing principal photography for a major motion picture. Goldschmidt said that the original plan had been to film in South Africa, since that country was more "geared up for this sort of thing", being a location often used for major films set in Africa. However, the decision was made to film in Ghana for the sake of authenticity, and despite the difficulties, Goldschmidt felt that that genuineness shone through in the finished work.

Omar Epps, the film's star, spoke a bit more positively about his experience in Ghana. He said that he was able to spend a good deal of time with Ofosu in preparing for the role. Epps also said that he had learned to speak a little bit of Twi.

In 2006, Ofosu expressed doubt that he had received fair compensation from Union Pictures for the film. He said that he had received US$67,500, but that that sum had been based on an estimate of the film's total production costs, of which he was to receive 1.5%. Ofosu claimed he'd never been given an accounting of the final production costs to determine if he was owed more. He also said that he was to receive 10% of the movie's net profits and, but that he had never seen any payment along those lines. Union Pictures (which had gone bankrupt by that time) co-producer Bradley Adams pointed the finger at HBO and the BBC, saying that he also had never seen any accounting of profits or total budget figures from the two companies.

== Reception ==
Newspaper reviews of Deadly Voyage were largely positive. Noting that its depictions of man's inhumanity to man were somewhat distressing to watch, the South Florida Sun-Sentinel labelled it an "effective film". The Daytona Beach News-Journal called it a "well-crafted drama" made all the more disturbing by the fact that observing Ofosu's true story was much like watching a fictional thriller film. The Kansas City Star branded it a "tough, provocative docudrama".

The New York Times, however, was more critical, offering that the film was "not a great movie" and declaring that most of its characters were "little more than stick figures". Nonetheless, the paper did see the movie as "nightmarishly harrowing", calling it a "searing descent into human cruelty", and praising the performances of Epps and Pertwee as the film's primary protagonist and antagonist respectively.
