= Electrum (software) =

Bitcoin cryptocurrency wallet

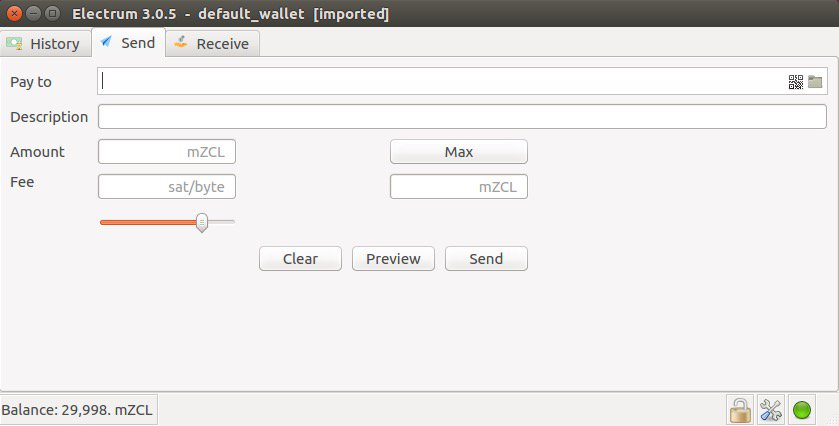
- Original author: Electrum Technologies GmbH
- Initial release: 2011
- Written in: Python
- Operating system: Linux, Windows, macOS, Android
- Type: Cryptocurrency wallet
- License: MIT License
- Website: electrum.org
- Repository: github.com/spesmilo/electrum

Electrum is a free non-custodial cryptocurrency wallet for Bitcoin and Lightning Network. It is available for Windows, Linux (pre-installed on Tails OS), macOS and Android. Electrum is written in Python and uses the Qt widget toolkit for the user interface. Electrum is a lightweight client: it does not download the entire blockchain and instead uses simplified payment verification. Transactions are sent to public servers. It was released in 2011.

== Reception ==
Mayank Sharma of TechRadar praised the wallet's advanced features, such as multisignature transactions, while noting that the wallet is not designed for inexperienced users. Marco Monroy Robles of Money liked Electrum's simple setup process, but criticized its lack of direct customer support.

== Security ==
Although wallet files are encrypted with PBKDF2, private keys are encrypted with AES256 with the user's password. This could allow an attacker with access to the encrypted data to decrypt the private keys using a dictionary attack or a brute force attack.
