= Robert Thompson (spy) =

American spy, born 1935

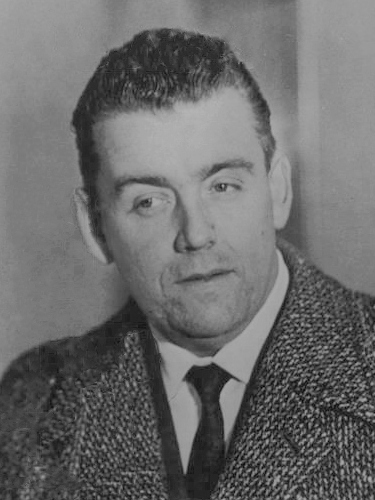
- Thompson in 1965
- Born: January 20, 1935 (age 91); Detroit, Michigan, U.S.
- Education: La Salle Extension University
- Occupations: U.S. Air Force enlisted clerk and spy

Robert Glenn Thompson (born January 20, 1935) is a former U.S. Air Force clerk who confessed in 1965 to passing hundreds of photos of secret documents to the Soviet Union since 1957 while he was based in West Berlin, at the Office of Special Investigation at Tempelhof Air Base. He served there from December 1952 to December 1958. He became an Airman Second Class.

Thompson was in contact with the Soviet intelligence after he returned to the United States. On June 7, 1963, Federal Bureau of Investigation surveillance watched a personal meeting with a known KGB officer and an individual who later was identified as Thompson.

Thompson was arrested on January 7, 1965, at his service station in Babylon, New York, where he was running a home fuel-oil delivery service as a truck driver. He pleaded guilty and received a 30-year sentence which he served in the Lewisburg Federal Penitentiary in Pennsylvania.

== Prisoner exchange ==
Thompson's release came in 1978 in a three-way spy swap. As part of the deal, an American student Alan van Norman who was arrested on August 2, 1977, in East Germany for trying to help a family escape East Germany and an Israeli pilot imprisoned by the Marxist regime in Mozambique were released. The swap was arranged by East German lawyer Wolfgang Vogel. The triple prisoner play was the result of several months of negotiations. Among the key Western officials involved in the bargaining was Congressman Benjamin Gilman, a New York Republican who has involved in obtaining freedom for a number of people imprisoned by Communist regimes.

== True identity ==
U.S. investigators held that Thompson was a Detroit-born American. Robert Glenn Thompson was born on January 1, 1935, in Detroit, Michigan. His mother Berenice M. Simmers got divorced and moved to Tucson, Arizona where she died in March 1993.

In 1991, intelligence author and historian Nigel West wrote in a British newspaper that he discovered Thompson was not an American but a German named Gregor Alexander Best with a wife named Sylvia and two children in East Germany. He wrote that Thompson was born in Germany to a Russian mother and a German father, served in the Red Army as a tank commander and was trained to spy by the KGB and sent to Canada in 1949.

Thompson himself claimed when he was released in 1978 that he was an East German who was born in Leipzig and that spying "was his job." He said that he was a Soviet agent and Thompson was his cover name.

In 2010, Nigel West said that Thompson's claims to be a Soviet intelligence officer were false and that evidently Thompson believed that he would not be exchanged in a spy-swap if he acknowledged being a US citizen.

German website 'Konfront' claims that he was in fact Gregor Alexander Best and that he died in the Berlin district of Friedrichshain on March 19, 2019 aged 93.
