= Maersk Dubai incident =

1996 murders of stowaways on a container ship

The Maersk Dubai incident involved four stowaways aboard the Taiwanese container ship Ming Fortune, which at the time was on long-term charter to the A.P. Moller-Maersk Group, sailing as the MV Maersk Dubai. On two consecutive voyages, in March and May 1996, three of the stowaways were killed when they were thrown overboard by the ship's captain and his officers. A fourth was spared the same fate when he was kept hidden by four other crew members until they reached their next destination of Halifax, Nova Scotia.

== Events ==
On 11 March 1996, while the Dubai was docked in Algeciras, Spain, two Romanians, Petre Sangeorzan and Radu Danciu, stowed away on board the ship. The next day, they were discovered by boatswain Rodolpho "Rudy" Miguel and brought to the captain, Shiou Cheng. Instead of putting them to work and leaving them at the next port, as is typically done at sea, Cheng and his chief officer, Chung-chih Wu, ordered the men put overboard on a makeshift raft of empty oil drums and wood fastened together with rope. Additionally, the men were given homemade life vests fashioned out of plastic foam. The ship was approximately 70 kilometres off the coast of Gibraltar.

Two more stowaways, Gheorghe Mihoc and Nicolae Pasca (also Romanians), boarded the ship upon its return to Algeciras. Then on May 18, 1996, while the vessel was en route to the Port of Halifax, Nova Scotia, Mihoc was found hiding in a large cargo container and was forced overboard at knifepoint by the captain and four of his officers. The remaining stowaway, Pasca, was discovered by Filipino sailor Rodolpho Miguel, who then kept Pasca hidden until the ship arrived in Halifax and docked on May 24, 1996. Upon arrival, the Maersk Dubai was stormed by the Royal Canadian Mounted Police (RCMP). Captain Cheng and his officers were arrested and charged with first degree murder while Miguel and seven other Filipino crewmen jumped ship. The radio operator attempted to escape by jumping into the harbour, and was later arrested. Captain Cheng attempted to deny access to the ship under international shipping laws.

A spokesman for Yang Ming Lines, owner of the Maersk Dubai, claimed the Filipino crew members had made false accusations in retaliation for a dispute over wages. The Filipino crewmen maintained that the stowaways had been thrown overboard in order to avoid paying a fine of US$5090 for each illegal immigrant brought into Canada. Craig Garson, QC, Duncan Beveridge, QC, Kevin Coady, David Bright, Warren Zimmer, Josh Arnold and Kevin Burke QC represented the Taiwanese crew members charged with murder who were involved in the extradition process. Lee Cohen, a Halifax immigration lawyer, acted on behalf of some of the Filipino crew members, while the Republic of China (Taiwan) retained the services of the Canadian criminal lawyer Edward Greenspan.

Taiwan protested the storming of the ship and the arrest of the officers, and contested the attempt by Canadian authorities to extradite them to Romania, citing Article 92 of the UN Convention on the Law of the Sea. Article 92 states that "Ships shall sail under the flag of one state only and, save in exceptional cases expressly provided for in international treaties or in this Convention, shall be subject to its exclusive jurisdiction on the high seas." Article 97 of the same Law further holds that "no arrest or detention of the ship, even as a measure of investigation, shall be ordered by any authorities other than those of the flag state." The flag state in this case was the Republic of China, which owns Yang Ming Lines.

One Taiwanese officer represented by lawyer Josh Arnold was discharged during the course of the extradition hearing when the Crown's witness recanted his allegations against him during cross examination. The officer was then allowed to leave Canada facing no charges and returned home.

Some of the other Taiwanese officers were eventually extradited to Taiwan. Captain Cheng was charged with criminal negligence causing death and was subsequently acquitted for lack of evidence regarding the stowaways' deaths. None of the other officers were brought to trial.

Several crew members claimed they saw no sign of the makeshift raft after the ship had passed, and believed that it might have been dragged under by the ship's wake. The three stowaways were never seen again. Their families received an out-of-court settlement after filing civil suit against Yang Ming Lines.

As of 2006 the surviving stowaway was living in Chicago, United States. Four of the Filipino crewmen who reported the incident have remained in Halifax, three of whom now work for the Canadian Coast Guard.

The incident was one of the main themes of progressive metal band Savatage's 1997 concept album The Wake of Magellan. A partially fictionalized version of the incident was the plot of the book The Stowaway by Robert Hough and the movie "Über Bord", a 60-minute documentary from 2005 by the German journalist Rainer Kahrs, reconstructs the story of the MV "Maersk Dubai". Kahrs and his film crew spoke with the surviving stowaway and sailors of the Maersk Dubai in Halifax and Chicago and interviewed officials of the shipping company and politicians in Taiwan.

== Ship ==
The Ming Fortune was built in 1983 by the China Shipbuilding Corporation at their Kaohsiung shipyard in Taiwan. Although the ship was owned, officered and crewed by the Yang Ming Marine Transport Corporation, in 1994, the ship was chartered long-term to the A.P. Moller-Maersk Group, where she sailed under the name MV Maersk Dubai. One month following the incident, in June 1996, she was renamed the Med Taichung and sailed under that name until August 2003, when she was again renamed the Kota Permas. In June 2004, she was renamed one final time to the YM Fortune and her current status is listed as "decommissioned or lost".

== See also ==
- Kingsley Ofosu
