= Doing Time: Life Inside the Big House =

1991 documentary film about the Lewisburg Federal Penitentiary

- Directed by: Alan Raymond
- Produced by: Alan Raymond; Susan Raymond
- Starring: Alan Raymond
- Cinematography: Alan Raymond
- Edited by: Alan Raymond
- Music by: Patrick O'Hearn
- Production company: Video Vérité
- Distributed by: HBO
- Release date: February 12, 1991
- Running time: 60 minutes
- Country: United States
- Language: English

Doing Time: Life Inside the Big House is a 1991 documentary film about the Lewisburg Federal Penitentiary, directed by Alan Raymond. It was nominated for an Academy Award for Best Documentary Feature. It was shown as part of HBO's America Undercover.

== Plot summary ==
Doing Time: Life Inside the Big House documents daily life inside Lewisburg Federal Penitentiary through interviews with inmates, guards, and prison officials. The film examines the effects of long-term incarceration in a system where rehabilitation and parole are largely absent.

== Cast and crew ==
=== Cast ===
- Alan Raymond – Narrator

=== Crew ===
- Director: Alan Raymond
- Producers: Alan Raymond, Susan Raymond
- Cinematography: Alan Raymond
- Editing: Alan Raymond
- Negative cutter: Jim Finn

== Production and release ==
The documentary was produced by Video Vérité and directed by Alan Raymond, who also served as cinematographer and editor. Susan Raymond was credited as producer, and Patrick O'Hearn composed the music. The film was originally released in 1991 and was later issued on DVD by Docurama and New Video Group in 2006.

== Reception ==
In a 1991 review for The New York Times, Walter Goodman described the documentary as a tough and direct look at life inside Lewisburg Federal Penitentiary. He noted the filmmakers’ cinéma vérité approach and wrote that the Raymonds "let their camera do the walking" as it follows inmates, guards, and officials through the institution.

In another review, Robert Koehler of the Los Angeles Times wrote that the film offers an intimate look inside Lewisburg Federal Prison but said the Raymonds’ point of view stays mostly in the background. He felt the documentary provides only basic material about prison life and adds little that is new, comparing it to their earlier work on "An American Family."

== Awards ==
Year	Award	Category	Result	Ref.
1992	Academy Awards	Best Documentary Feature	Nominated	
