= Tails (operating system) =

Linux distribution for anonymity and privacy

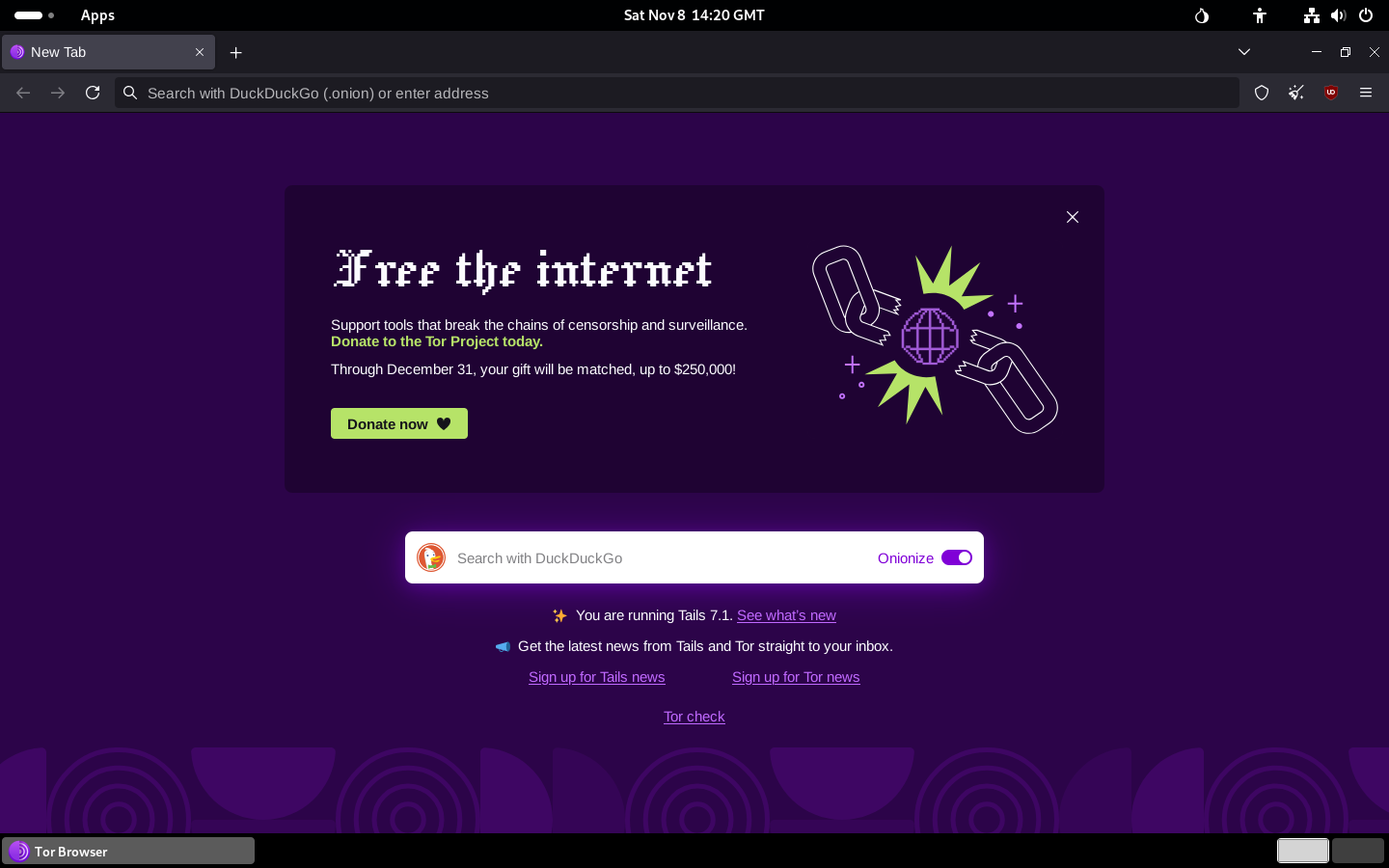
- Tor Browser 14.5.8 running on Tails 7.1
- Developer: The Tails Project
- OS family: Linux (Unix-like)
- Working state: Active
- Source model: Open source
- Initial release: June 23, 2009; 17 years ago
- Latest release: 7.17 / 11 November 2026; 5 days ago
- Repository: gitlab.tails.boum.org/tails/tails
- Marketing target: Personal computers
- Update method: Tails Upgrader
- Package manager: APT (front-end), dpkg
- Supported platforms: x86-64
- Kernel type: Monolithic
- Userland: GNU
- Default user interface: GNOME 48
- License: GNU GPLv3
- Preceded by: Incognito
- Official website: tails.net

Tails, or "The Amnesic Incognito Live System", is a security-focused Debian-based Linux distribution running on a computer, aimed at preserving privacy and anonymity against surveillance. It connects to the Internet exclusively through the anonymity overlay network Tor. The system is designed to be booted as a live DVD or live USB and never writes to the hard drive or SSD, leaving no digital footprint on the machine unless explicitly told to do so.

In 2024, Tails merged with the Tor Project.

== History ==
Tails was first released on June 23, 2009. It is the next iteration of development on Incognito, a discontinued Gentoo-based Linux distribution. The original project was called Amnesia. The operating system was born when Amnesia was merged with Incognito. The Tor Project provided financial support for its development in the beginnings of the project. Tails also received funding from the Open Technology Fund, Mozilla, and the Freedom of the Press Foundation.

Laura Poitras, Glenn Greenwald, Bruce Schneier and Barton Gellman have each said that Tails was an important tool they used in their work with National Security Agency whistleblower Edward Snowden.

From release 3.0 (2017) onwards, Tails requires a 64-bit processor to run.

In 2023, the Tails Project approached the Tor Project to merge operations. The merger was completed on September 26, 2024, stating that, "By joining forces, the Tails team can now focus on their core mission of maintaining and improving Tails OS, exploring more and complementary use cases while benefiting from the larger organizational structure of The Tor Project."

== Features ==
Tails must be installed on a DVD or USB stick dedicated to running Tails only, for security, and must be run on a PC-compatible computer, not a mobile phone or tablet. Though the system can also run as a virtual machine, running Tails in a virtual machine is potentially insecure.

Tails' pre-installed desktop environment is GNOME. The system includes essential software for functions such as reading and editing documents, editing images, watching videos, printing, and instant messaging. It also includes specialized security software such as GnuPG to sign and encrypt files, the cryptocurrency wallet Electrum, and OnionShare to share files anonymously. Other software from Debian can be installed at the user's behest. Despite being open-source, Tails contains non-free firmware blobs.

Tails forces all network connections to use Tor and includes a modified version of Tor Browser that comes with the uBlock Origin browser extension.

By design, Tails is "amnesic". It runs in the computer's random access memory (RAM) and does not write to the hard drive or SSD. The user may choose to keep files, applications or some settings on their Tails drive in "Persistent Storage", which is encrypted by default, but is not hidden and easily detectable, though not readable, by forensic analysis. While shutting down, Tails overwrites most of the used RAM to avoid a cold boot attack.

== Hardware support ==
Tails is based on Linux. Linux generally supports a wide range of hardware, including many older devices, due to standardized drivers. There may be problems with some hardware for which Linux drivers are not available, or not supported by Tails. Wi-Fi hardware, in particular, can be incompatible without a workaround, requiring a cable for Internet connection. Touchpads and graphics can cause problems which can be worked around.

== Security incidents ==
In 2014, Das Erste reported that the US National Security Agency (NSA)'s XKeyscore surveillance system sets threat definitions for people who search for Tails using a search engine or visit the Tails website. A comment in XKeyscore's source code calls Tails "a comsec mechanism advocated by extremists on extremist forums".

In the same year, Der Spiegel published slides from an internal NSA presentation dating to June 2012, in which the NSA deemed Tails on its own as a "major threat" to its mission and in conjunction with other privacy tools as "catastrophic".

In 2017, the US Federal Bureau of Investigation (FBI) used malicious code developed by Facebook, identifying sexual extortionist and Tails user Buster Hernandez through a zero-day vulnerability in the system's default video player, GNOME Videos. The exploit was never explained to or discovered by the Tails developers, but it is believed that the vulnerability was patched in a later release of Tails. Hernandez had eluded authorities for a long time; the FBI and Facebook had searched for him with no success, and resorted to developing the custom hacking tool. He was arrested in 2017, and in 2021 he was sentenced to 75 years in prison.

== See also ==
- Computer and network surveillance
- Crypto-anarchism
- Dark web
- Deep web
- Internet censorship
- Linux
- Mass surveillance
- Off-the-record messaging
- Qubes OS
- Whonix
