= Buster Hernandez =

American sexual extortionist (born 1990)

- Born: Buster Jim Hernandez; August 17, 1990 (age 36); Bakersfield, California, U.S.
- Status: Incarcerated
- Penalty: 75 years in prison

Details
- Victims: 376+
- Imprisoned at: United States Penitentiary, Tucson

Buster Jim Hernandez (born August 17, 1990) is an American sexual extortionist, child pornography producer and cyberterrorist from Bakersfield, California. He used the internet extensively to target hundreds of underage girls under many pseudonyms, most notoriously Brian Kil and Purge of Maine. In 2017, he was arrested after falling for a social engineering and hacking scheme by the FBI and Facebook, and in 2021, he was convicted and sentenced to 75 years in prison.

== Criminal history ==
Starting from 2012, Hernandez, an unemployed man in his twenties who lived in Bakersfield with his girlfriend and her grandmother, committed a series of crimes on the internet from his home. He extorted ("sextorted") sexual photographs from at least 375 high school-age girls from ten or more US states. To pressure his victims, he threatened to murder, rape and abduct them, and to commit mass killings at their schools. These threats caused multiple local schools and businesses to shut down temporarily. Furthermore, Hernandez would strategically post media online which he had already received to extract more sexual content from his targets. Hernandez used dozens of aliases.

In 2015, the FBI noticed his case after a report from police in Plainfield, Indiana. Facebook, a platform he used to communicate with his victims, had been investigating him for years in the hope of exposing his identity. He was hard to catch because he used Tails, an anonymity-focused operating system, so Facebook paid an external company to co-develop an exploit that could de-anonymize him. Exploiting a security hole in the Tails video player, Facebook transferred the custom-made hacking tool to an unnamed party, which in turn transferred it to the FBI. He downloaded and watched a video that appeared to be extracted from one of his victims, which was coded to reveal de-anonymizing information. According to Facebook developers, this was the only case in the history of Facebook where it pursued a criminal by sending a malicious file. This method was described in the news and technology press as "virus-like" and "hacking".

== Arrest and conviction ==
After this, Hernandez was identified and arrested in 2017. He was charged federally on 41 counts and in 2021 was sentenced to 75 years in prison. As of 8 August 2026, he is imprisoned in the high-security United States Penitentiary, Tucson, Arizona.
