= Federal Correctional Institution, Petersburg =

Prison in Virginia, US

Coordinates: 37°18′15″N 77°20′48″W

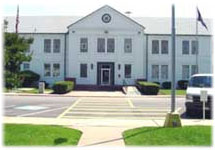
- Interactive map of Federal Correctional Institution, Petersburg
- Location: Prince George County, near Hopewell, Virginia
- Status: Operational
- Security class: Low- and medium-security (with minimum-security prison camp)
- Population: 1,111 at Low; 1,595 at Medium; and 293 at minimum-security camp
- Managed by: Federal Bureau of Prisons

The Federal Correctional Institution, Petersburg (FCI Petersburg) is a United States federal prison for low- and medium-security male inmates located in unincorporated Prince George County, Virginia. It is part of the Petersburg Federal Correctional Complex (FCC) in Virginia and operated by the Federal Bureau of Prisons, a division of the United States Department of Justice. An adjacent satellite prison camp houses minimum-security male offenders. FCI Petersburg consists of two facilities:

- Federal Correctional Institution, Petersburg Low: a low-security facility
- Federal Correctional Institution, Petersburg Medium: a medium-security facility

FCC Petersburg is located 25 miles (40 km) southeast of Richmond, Virginia, the state capital. It lies just west of the independent city of Hopewell, Virginia.

== Facility and programs ==
FCI Petersburg offers numerous educational opportunities, including a GED Program, English as-a-Second Language, Occupational Education, Post-Secondary Education, Adult Continuing Education, as well as Parenting Classes and Release Preparation. The facility also has a Law Library which compliant inmates may use periodically.

FCI Petersburg is one of several federal prison facilities which offer sex offender treatment programs. The Sex Offender Management Program (SOMP) at FCI Petersburg was established to assist in effectively managing the Bureau of Prisons' population of offenders with sex offense histories. The program consists of assessment/evaluation, treatment, and monitoring/managing components. The assessment/evaluation component of SOMP is non-voluntary because it assists correctional staff in determining whether the inmate is likely to engage in risk relevant behavior while incarcerated. The remaining elements of the program are voluntary.

== Notable incidents ==
In 2008, a joint investigation conducted by the FBI and the Bureau of Prisons found that an inmate at FCI Petersburg, John Leighnor, was coordinating an ongoing identity-theft scheme from the facility. Leighnor was already serving a 7-year-sentence dating from a conviction in 2003 for another identity-theft scheme. Armed with the names of his victims, Leighnor drafted correspondence to be sent by mail to various governmental agencies and other organizations to obtain official documentation for his targets. In connection with each mailing, Leighnor either claimed that he was the person he was victimizing or that he was a lawyer, advocate, or other designated representative for a targeted victim. He requested the victim's personal documentation, such as birth certificates, family information, undergraduate transcripts, enrollment applications, and death certificates. Leighnor directed that all return correspondence be sent to his attention at various addresses, including: "Dept. 14375-077, P.O. Box 1000, Petersburg, Virginia 23804." He concealed the fact that the correspondence would be delivered to him at FCI Petersburg and that "14375-077" was his federal prisoner identification number.

Upon receiving the victim's identifying information, Leighnor planned to obtain passports, birth certificates, driver's licenses, and other identification documents for himself in the victims' names, to be used in traveling and obtaining funds from financial institutions and individuals. Leighnor also possessed documents and made statements to other inmates at FCI Petersburg about his plans to file claims with the Claims Resolution Tribunal (the entity charged with handling claims on Swiss bank accounts believed to have been abandoned by victims of Nazi persecution during World War II), in order to gain control of abandoned funds in the Swiss bank accounts connected to Holocaust victims.

In 2009, Leighnor was sentenced to an additional 8 years in prison for mail fraud and identity theft related to the FCI Petersburg scheme. He was held at the Federal Correctional Institution, Fort Dix, a low-security facility in New Jersey. He was released in 2016 after completing his sentence.

A joint investigation conducted by the FBI and the Department of Justice Inspector General found that a correction officer at FCC Petersburg, Keif Jackson, conspired with inmate Walter Brooks to smuggle heroin inside the facility. In 2008, Brooks recruited Jackson to smuggle heroin to him in the prison. At Brooks' request, Officer Jackson contacted acquaintances of Brooks. He met with them on several occasions to obtain heroin, and smuggled the drugs into the prison. After Brooks was released from FCC Petersburg in 2010, Brooks began supplying heroin to Jackson to smuggle into the prison. Approximately one year later, on Oct. 10, 2011, Jackson was stopped by the police on his way to work. Upon searching his vehicle, officers recovered a package containing heroin.

Jackson entered a guilty plea to conspiracy to distribute heroin in March 2012 and was sentenced to 12 months in prison.

In September 2012, a federal jury convicted Brooks, 57, of conspiracy to provide contraband to inmates, conspiracy to distribute heroin, five counts of providing contraband to inmates, and three counts of use of a communication facility to commit a felony.

== Notable inmates (current and former) ==
Inmate Name	Register Number	Photo	Status	Details
Abelhaleem Hasan Abdelraziq Ashqar	41500-054		Served a 135 month sentence; released in 2017.	Convicted of refusing to testify regarding his connections to Hamas.
Richard Chandler	44076-074		Serving a 25-year sentence; scheduled for release in 2032.	Former Tennessee police officer; arrested in the largest child pornography prosecution in US history; pleaded guilty in 2012 to contributing to "Dreamboard", a website whose members produced and traded images and videos of adults molesting children.
Al Clark	26147-050		Released on November 10, 2004	Clark was sentenced to four months in prison and was incarcerated at Petersburg for a fraudulent scheme involving baseball memorabilia.
Mohamed Elshinawy	60500-037		Serving a 20-year sentence, scheduled for release in 2032. Currently at FTC Oklahoma City.	Convicted in 2018 of providing material support to ISIS.
Sharpe James	28791-050		Released from custody in 2010 after serving 18 months.	Mayor of Newark, New Jersey from 1986 to 2006; convicted of fraud in 2008 for selling city properties to his girlfriend, Tamika Riley, for a fraction of their actual cost.
David A. Kaye	71353-083		Released from custody in 2016 after serving 6 years.	Jewish rabbi; convicted in 2006 of coercion and traveling with intent to engage in illicit sexual conduct for trying to solicit sex from a 13-year-old boy over the Internet in 2005; featured on the Dateline NBC series To Catch a Predator.
Roger Loughry, Sr.	43691-037		Serving a 30-year sentence; scheduled for release in 2034. Now at FCI Butner.	Administrator of "The Cache", an online bulletin board where hundreds of child pornographers from around the world shared images and videos of children being molested; convicted in 2013 of advertising and distributing child pornography.
Paul Nicholas Miller	32607-509		Was serving a 41-month sentence. Released from custody on July 3, 2023.	American far-right political commentator and streamer, known online as 'GypsyCrusader'. Miller is best known for his cosplays of various characters, most notably Joker. Miller was indicted on charges of possessing a firearm as convicted felon and possession of unregistered rifle on February 25, 2021, stemming from an incident that took place in January 2018.
Zachary Rehl	34945-509		Sentenced to 15 years. Released after sentence was commuted by President Donald J. Trump on January 20, 2025.	Participant in the January 6 United States Capitol attack.
Frank Ronghi	16788-045		Serving a life sentence. Transferred from the United States Disciplinary Barracks.	Former U.S. Army Staff Sergeant and war criminal who raped and murdered 10-year-old Merita Shabiu in Kosovo. Also boasted of committed rapes in Haiti and Saudi Arabia, and other murders in Iraq and Kuwait during the Gulf War, albeit none of this could be confirmed.
Eric Justin Toth	32508-016		Serving a 25-year sentence; scheduled for release in 2034. Now at FCI Fort Dix.	Former Washington, D.C., elementary school teacher and FBI Ten Most Wanted fugitive; apprehended in Nicaragua in 2013 after five years on the run; pleaded guilty in 2013 to production of child pornography.
Jack Teixeira	54136-510		Serving a 15-year sentence; scheduled for released in 2036. Now at ADX Florence.	American airman in the 102nd Intelligence Wing of the Massachusetts Air National Guard who was charged with unauthorized retention and transmission of national defense information in violation of the Espionage Act of 1917 and unauthorized removal and retention of classified documents or material.
Chuck Zito	12032-054		Served a portion of a ten-year drug conspiracy sentence at FCI Petersburg	President of the New York Nomads chapter of the Hells Angels; pleaded guilty to conspiracy to distribute methamphetamine in 1986
Brian Tod Schellenberger	23875-056		Serving a 100-year sentence; scheduled for released in 2089.	Former software developer, in 2005 Schellenberger was sentenced to 100 years in prison for production of child pornography and other charges.
Austin Michael Burak	96115-510	Mugshot of Austin Michael Burak	Serving Two Concurrent Life Sentences; Not scheduled for release.	Former Army mechanic convicted for sexually abusing two children on Fort Stewart, Georgia in 2017.

== See also ==
- List of United States federal prisons
- Federal Bureau of Prisons
- Incarceration in the United States
