= 2015 Maryland terrorism plot =

Terrorist attempt in the United States

Mohamed Elshinawy is a 30-year-old alleged Islamist operative arrested on December 14, 2015 in Edgewood, Maryland, and charged with pledging allegiance to the Islamic State of Iraq and the Levant (ISIS), "attempting to provide material support" to ISIS, and accepting ISIS funding to carry out such a terrorist attack inside the United States.

According to the United States Department of Justice, Elshinawy received $8,700, which was allegedly sent to him by an ISIS operative in Egypt. The receipt, made by a U.S. resident, is a new development among people in the U.S. charged with supporting ISIS. According to the Federal Bureau of Investigation (FBI), Elshinawy used multiple email identities, social media, and "pay as you go" phones to communicate with ISIS operatives. The FBI also stated that Elshinawy was caught because he received suspect foreign funds.

According to the legal complaint, federal investigators claim that earlier in 2015, Elshinawy said to his brother that he pledged to support ISIS and wanted "to die as a martyr for the Islamic State."

Elshinawy is the first person in Maryland to be charged by federal prosecutors with having ties to ISIS. 75 court cases have been brought in the United States in 2015 on charges of supporting ISIS.
