= Conviction (2002 film) =

2002 American television film by Kevin Rodney Sullivan

- Genre: Biographical drama; Crime drama
- Based on: Convicted in the Womb by Carl Upchurch
- Teleplay by: Carl Upchurch; Jon Huffman
- Directed by: Kevin Rodney Sullivan
- Starring: Omar Epps; Dana Delany; Bentley Mitchum; Charles S. Dutton
- Music by: Jeff Beal
- Country of origin: United States
- Original language: English

Production
- Executive producer: Robert Rehme
- Producer: Nick Grillo
- Cinematography: Mirosław Baszak
- Editor: Jeff Freeman
- Running time: 99 minutes
- Production companies: Sagia Productions; Paramount Television

Original release
- Network: Showtime
- Release: September 29, 2002

Conviction is a 2002 American biographical drama television film about Carl Upchurch, a felon who managed to educate himself and developed a spiritual awakening during one of his numerous stints inside prison. He began to spread his message to other inmates, and soon he was asked to help mediate problems between some of the most feared street gangs in the country. It was directed by Kevin Rodney Sullivan and written by Upchurch and Jon Huffman, based on Upchurch's 1996 autobiography Convicted in the Womb. Omar Epps stars as Upchurch, with Dana Delany, Bentley Mitchum, and Charles S. Dutton co-starring. The film aired on Showtime on September 29, 2002.

== Cast ==
- Omar Epps as Carl Upchurch
- Dana Delany as Martha
- Bentley Mitchum as Ledford
- Charles S. Dutton as McGill
- Treach as Tank
- Kyle Kass as Demetrius Conamacher
- Jonathan Whittaker as Bob Conamacher
- Janine Theriault as Andrea Santoni
- Peter Mensah as T-Bone

== Production ==
Filming took place in Ontario, Canada, from May to June 2001.
