= Robert Lee Johnson (spy) =

American spy for the Soviet Union

Robert Lee Johnson (1922 – May 18, 1972) was an American sergeant who spied for the Soviet Union.

Johnson volunteered to spy for the KGB while he was stationed at Berlin, Germany. He also recruited a former Army friend, James Mintkenbaugh. Johnson worked for the KGB between 1953 and 1964, and passed on information while stationed at various sites in Europe and the U.S.

Most famously, when working in the U.S. courier center at Orly Airport south of Paris, he occasionally had night duty alone in the center, where dispatches arrived to and from Air Force and Army bases in Europe. He used to come out of the center and hand KGB contacts envelopes full of documents to photocopy. They had a car waiting in which they sped to the Soviet embassy, photographed the documents, replaced them, and resealed the envelopes so there was no trace that they had been opened. Then they rushed them back to Orly to get them to Johnson before he went off duty in the morning.

In 1964, Johnson was turned in by his wife and, like Mintkenbaugh, received a 25-year prison sentence in 1965.

Johnson, who was imprisoned at Lewisburg Federal Penitentiary, was stabbed to death there by his son in 1972: "Johnson, having not seen his son for many years, reached out to shake his hand in the prison reception area when, without saying a word, Robert stabbed his father in the chest. ... Later, when questioned by the FBI as to the motive of the killing, Robert refused to say anything other than "It was a personal matter". Robert Lee Johnson, Jr., was released from prison on December 6, 1983.
