= Omar Epps =

American actor and musician (born 1973)

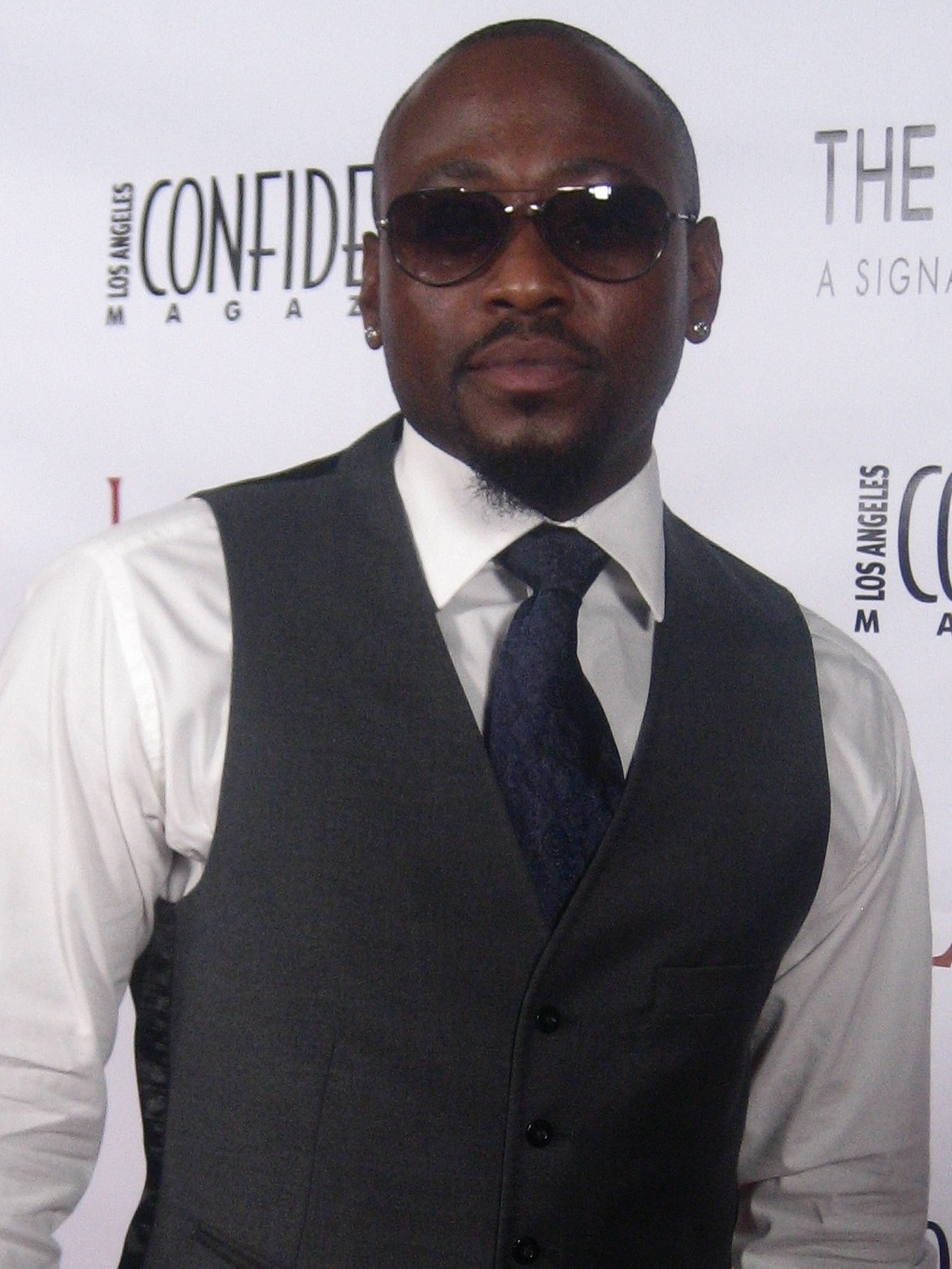
- Epps in 2008
- Born: Omar Hashim Epps; July 20, 1973 (age 53); New York City, U.S.
- Occupations: Actor; rapper; producer
- Years active: 1988–present
- Spouse: Keisha Spivey (m. 2006)
- Children: 3

Omar Hashim Epps (born July 20, 1973) is an American actor, rapper, and producer. He attended Fiorello H. LaGuardia High School of Music & Art and Performing Arts, prior to making his film debut alongside Tupac Shakur in the 1992 crime drama Juice. His film credits include Higher Learning (1995), Scream 2 (1997), The Wood (1999), In Too Deep (1999), Love & Basketball (2000), and Almost Christmas (2016), several of which are considered notable within Black cinema.

His television work includes the role of Dr. Dennis Gant on the medical drama series ER, J. Martin Bellamy in Resurrection, Dr. Eric Foreman on the Fox medical drama series House from 2004 to 2012, Isaac Johnson in the TV series Shooter from 2016 to 2018, and Detective Malcolm Howard on the Starz crime drama Power Book III: Raising Kanan. He has won three NAACP Image Awards and was nominated for a Screen Actors Guild Award.

== Early life ==
Omar Epps was born in Brooklyn. His parents divorced during his childhood and he was raised by his mother, Bonnie Maria Epps, an elementary school principal. He lived in several Brooklyn neighborhoods while growing up (Bedford–Stuyvesant, East New York, and East Flatbush). He began writing poetry, short stories and songs at the age of ten. He attended Fiorello H. LaGuardia High School of Music & Art and Performing Arts, New York City's highly selective public high school for students with artistic talent. Before he started acting, he belonged to a rap group called Wolfpack which he formed with his cousin in 1991.

== Career ==
In 1992, Epps made his feature film debut playing a DJ alongside rapper 2Pac as the star of cinematographer Ernest Dickerson's directorial film debut Juice. The following year, Epps played one of several roles as an athlete, the first as a running back in the college football drama The Program alongside James Caan. In 1994, he returned to sports, as co-star of Major League II, taking over the role of center fielder Willie Mays Hayes from its originator, Wesley Snipes. His next athletic endeavor was playing a track and field star in John Singleton's Higher Learning, a look at the politics and racial tensions of college life. Epps led the cast in the 1996 BBC/HBO film Deadly Voyage, as a Ghanaian attempting to hide with other stowaways on a major commercial vessel leaving Africa. He won the best actor award at the Monte Carlo Television Festival for portraying Kingsley Ofusu in this true story about the plight of undocumented African stowaways hoping to reach America.

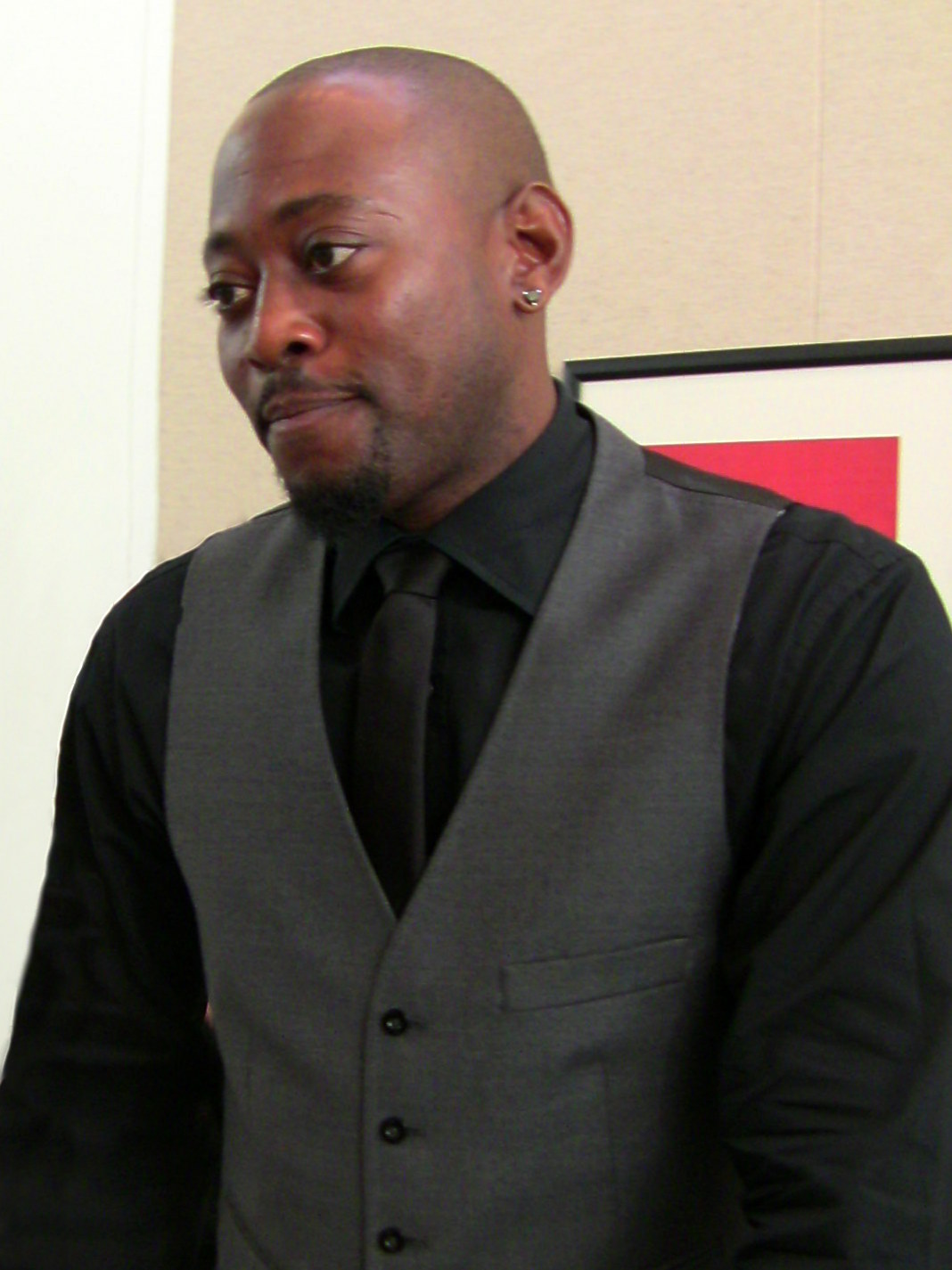
Epps at the Paley Center for Media, Beverly Hills, California, on June 17, 2009

In his network television debut, Epps guest starred as Dr. Dennis Gant, a surgical intern struggling with depression, on the hit medical drama ER for several episodes in its third season. After his television work on ER, Epps returned to film in 1997 with a role as a giddy moviegoer, on a date with a woman played by Jada Pinkett Smith, who ends up an early victim of a psychopathic slasher in the blockbuster sequel Scream 2. Also in 1997, Epps starred in the fact-based HBO movie First Time Felon as a small-time criminal who goes through Chicago's boot camp reform system and undertakes a heroic flood rescue, only to be faced with the adjustment of re-entering society with the mark of ex-con. In 1999, Epps was cast as Linc in The Mod Squad. While The Mod Squad proved a critical and box-office bust, Epps's later 1999 effort The Wood offered him a serious and multi-dimensional role as Mike Tarver, narrator and lead of this critically acclaimed coming-of-age ensemble comedy. Following a group of middle-class African Americans from youth to adulthood, the debut effort from director-screenwriter Rick Famuyiwa co-starred Richard T. Jones and Taye Diggs. Also in 1999, Epps was featured alongside Stanley Tucci and LL Cool J, playing an undercover detective who finds himself caught up in the illegal goings-on he is investigating in In Too Deep.

In 2000, Epps starred in Love & Basketball, featuring Alfre Woodard and Sanaa Lathan. He portrayed Quincy, the NBA hopeful who has a stormy relationship with an equally adept female basketball star Monica, played by Lathan. Epps followed with supporting roles in a wide range of films, including Dracula 2000, Big Trouble, and the telepic Conviction. He had a leading role as a gangster in Brother, a movie by the celebrated Japanese actor/director Takeshi Kitano.

In 2004, Epps played drug-dealer-turned-prizefighter Luther Shaw who falls under the tutelage of boxing promoter Jackie Kallen (Meg Ryan) in the film biopic Against the Ropes. That same year, Epps was a character in the video game Def Jam Fight for NY. Epps also returned to a top-rated medical television drama in 2004, with his role as the brilliant neurologist, Dr. Eric Foreman, who stands his ground medically against the routine barbs of the irascible Dr. House (Hugh Laurie) on the award-winning Fox television series House. The role in the long-running series earned him an NAACP Image Award in 2007, 2008 and 2013 for Outstanding Supporting Actor in a Drama Series.

In 2014, Epps took on the role of agent J. Martin Bellamy in the ABC television series, Resurrection. The series focuses on a number of individuals who return from the dead, and change the lives of their families and friends in Arcadia, Missouri.

In July 2020, Epps starred in the Netflix psychological thriller Fatal Affair. Since 2021, Epps has appeared as Detective Malcolm Howard in the Starz crime drama Power Book III: Raising Kanan.

In 2022, it was announced that Epps would star in the Lee Daniels-directed supernatural horror The Deliverance alongside Mo'Nique, Andra Day, Miss Lawrence, and Tasha Smith. The film was released in select theaters and on Netflix in August 2024.

== Personal life ==
From 1999 to 2001, Epps dated actress Sanaa Lathan, whom he met while filming The Wood. The pair did not disclose their relationship to Love & Basketball director Gina Prince-Bythewood until they were on the set of the film, fearing that "she could have a beef about it".

Epps married singer Keisha Spivey, from the R&B group Total, in 2006. They have two children. He also has a daughter from a previous relationship.

Epps and actor/comedian Marlon Wayans are longtime friends. They met as high school classmates at LaGuardia High, both graduating in 1990. The 1997−1999 theme song used for the sitcom The Wayans Brothers was co-produced by Epps, with Marlon and Shawn Wayans.

In a 2018 interview, Epps denied the long-standing rumor that he is related to fellow actor Mike Epps, saying, "Me and Mike Epps ain't related, though, we spoke like, 'Where you from? Where you from?'" He is, however, a cousin of rapper 2 Chainz.

Epps authored an autobiography titled From Fatherless to Fatherhood that was released by Lulu Publishing in June 2018.

Epps serves on the Cultural Council of RepresentUs, a nonprofit organization that focuses on passing anti-corruption laws in the United States. In June 2020, he narrated an educational video for the organization about America's criminal justice system.

== Filmography ==
=== Film ===
Year	Title	Role	Notes
1988	The Green Flash	Charlie	Short film
1992	Juice	Quincy (Q)	
1993	Daybreak	Hunter	
1993	The Program	Darnell Jefferson	
1994	Major League II	Willie Mays Hayes	
1995	Higher Learning	Malik Williams	
1996	The Deadly Voyage	Kingsley	
1996	Don't Be a Menace to South Central While Drinking Your Juice in the Hood	Malik	Cameo
1997	Scream 2	Phil Stevens	
1997	First Time Felon	Greg Yance	
1998	Blossoms and Veils	Thee	
1999	Breakfast of Champions	Wayne Hoobler	
1999	The Mod Squad	Linc	
1999	The Wood	Mike	
1999	In Too Deep	Jeff Cole / J Reid	
2000	Love & Basketball	Quincy McCall	Nominated – Black Reel Award for Best Theatrical Actor; Nominated – MTV Movie Award for Best Male Performance; Nominated – NAACP Image Award for Outstanding Actor in a Motion Picture; Nominated – Teen Choice Award for Choice Film Actor; Nominated – Teen Choice Award for Choice Film Chemistry with Sanaa Lathan
2000	Brother	Denny	
2000	Dracula 2000	Marcus	
2001	Perfume	JB	
2002	Big Trouble	FBI Agent Alan Seitz	
2004	Against the Ropes	Luther Shaw	
2004	Alfie	Marlon	
2009	A Day in the Life	O	
2016	Almost Christmas	Malachi	
2018	Traffik	John	
2019	Trick	Det. Mike Denver	
2019	3022	John Laine	
2020	Fatal Affair	David Hammond	
2022	The Devil You Know	Marcus Cowans	
2024	The Deliverance	Melvin	
2026	Moses the Black	Malik	

=== Television ===
Year	Title	Role	Notes
1993	Here and Now	Curtis	2 episodes
1993	Street Justice	Clint	Episode: "Black or Blue"
1996	Deadly Voyage	Kingsley Ofosu	Television film Festival de Télévision de Monte-Carlo Silver Nymph Award for Best Actor; Nominated – NAACP Image Award for Outstanding Television Movie, Mini-Series or Dramatic Special
1996–1997	ER	Dr. Dennis Gant	Recurring role, 10 episodes
2002	Conviction	Carl Upchurch	Television film Nominated – NAACP Image Award for Outstanding Actor in a Television Movie, Mini-Series or Dramatic Special
2004–2012	House	Dr. Eric Foreman	2007 NAACP Image Award for Outstanding Supporting Actor in a Drama Series; 2008 NAACP Image Award for Outstanding Supporting Actor in a Drama Series; 2013 NAACP Image Award for Outstanding Supporting Actor in a Drama Series; Nominated – 2005 NAACP Image Award for Outstanding Supporting Actor in a Drama Series; Nominated – 2006 NAACP Image Award for Outstanding Actor in a Drama Series; Nominated – 2009 NAACP Image Award for Outstanding Actor in a Drama Series; Nominated – 2009 Screen Actors Guild Award for Outstanding Performance by an Ensemble in a Drama Series
2014–2015	Resurrection	Immigration and Customs Agent J. Martin "Marty" Bellamy	Nominated – 2015 NAACP Image Award for Outstanding Supporting Actor in a Drama Series
2016–2018	Shooter	Captain Isaac Johnson	Main role
2019–2020	This Is Us	Darnell Hodges	Recurring role (Season 4)
2021–2025	Power Book III: Raising Kanan	Detective Malcolm Howard	Main cast (Seasons 1–3) Guest (Season 4)

=== Video games ===
Year	Title	Role	Notes
2004	Def Jam: Fight for NY	O.E.	Voice

== Discography ==
- Omar Epps Presents... The Get Back (2004)
