= Operation Nest Egg =

- Operation name: Operation Nest Egg
- Type: Child pornography crackdown

Participants
- Planned by: United States
- Executed by: United States
- No. of countries participating: 1

Mission
- Target: Website: thecachebbs.com

Timeline
- Date executed: 2008

Operation Nest Egg was an international law enforcement initiative aimed at dismantling an online network dedicated to the distribution and trade of child pornography. Launched in February 2008, the operation was a collaborative effort involving multiple law enforcement agencies, including the U.S. Department of Justice, the U.S. Postal Inspection Service (USPIS), and U.S. Immigration and Customs Enforcement (ICE).

The primary focus of the investigation was the bulletin board style website thecachebbs.com which at its peak had around 1,000 members. As of February 2008, postal inspectors had already seized the main servers from Caro.net, a web host based in North Carolina. This caused periodic downtime which prompted the site admins to move the hosting to Atomic Colo in Minnesota. A backup server that was utilized during the periods of downtime was hosted by Future Hosting in Dallas, TX.

Operation Nest Egg was a spinoff investigation developed from leads related to another international investigation, "Operation Joint Hammer," which targeted transnational rings of child pornography trafficking. Operation Delego was a subsequent spinoff investigation from leads developed through "Operation Nest Egg," the prosecution of another online group dedicated to sharing and disseminating child pornography. Operation Joint Hammer was spawned by Operation Koala which led to 40 arrests in Britain, 21 in France, 11 in Spain, eight in Sweden, five in Belgium, four in Italy, two in Iceland and one in Denmark.

== Trial of Roger Loughry ==
A decision was made to go after the leadership of The Cache on conspiracy charges instead of prosecuting each member individually. This meant that the administrators could be consolidated into one criminal case handled by prosecutor Steven DeBrota. This also meant that evidence and discovery were limited to activities directly related to The Cache instead of material from the defendants homes, which in some cases was worse.

Despite this, DeBrota brought a postal inspector to the stand who testified about the material seized from Roger Loughry's house which contained videos of men having sex with underage girls. Since they did not come from The Cache, however, they were not part of the conspiracy charges against Loughry. DeBrota insisted on showing the videos to the jury. Loughry and his team objected as the material was outside the scope of the case and could be used to sway the jurors' emotions. DeBrota insisted that the material needed to be presented to demonstrate that Loughry misunderstood the definition of child pornography, as Loughry had previously argued that the material on The Cache did not constitute child pornography as it was almost exclusively still image of genitalia. The judge ruled in favor of the prosecutor.

After his sentencing, Loughry got a new lawyer and appealed his conviction on the basis that the videos had prejudiced the jury. On October 11 2011, the appeals court of Chicago ruled that the videos had indeed been "highly inflammatory and had only minimal probative value. These errors were not harmless." The entire case was overturned and Loughry was granted a new trial. In 2013 Loughry was again found guilty on all 16 charges. He was sentenced to 30 years in prison as well as lifetime supervised release.
