= Operation Delego =

2009 child pornography investigation

- Operation name: Operation Delego
- Type: Child pornography crackdown

Participants
- Planned by: United States
- Executed by: Canada, Denmark, Ecuador, France, Germany, Hungary, Kenya, the Netherlands, the Philippines, Qatar, Serbia, Sweden, Switzerland and the United States
- No. of countries participating: 15+

Mission
- Target: Website: Dreamboard

Timeline
- Date executed: 2009

Operation Delego was a major international child pornography investigation, launched in 2009, which dismantled an international child sex ring that operated an invitation-only Internet site named Dreamboard which featured incentives for images of the violent sexual abuse of young children under twelve, including infants. Only 72 charges were filed against the approximately 600 members of Dreamboard due to the extensive encryption involved. Members were required to upload new material at least every 50 days to maintain their access and remain in good standing.

Operation Delego is a spinoff investigation from leads developed through "Operation Nest Egg," the prosecution of another online group dedicated to sharing and disseminating child pornography. Operation Nest Egg was a spinoff investigation developed from leads related to another international investigation, "Operation Joint Hammer," which targeted transnational rings of child pornography trafficking. Dozens of law enforcement agencies were involved worldwide in Delego, including Eurojust, and arrests were made on all five continents. Twenty of those charged, however, are only known by their Internet handles, and as such were individually charged as John Does and remain at large. However, some of the indictments were unsealed as of August 2011, and the names of some of those involved in Dreamboard are publicly available.

United States Department of Homeland Security Secretary Janet Napolitano stated at a news conference that "The board may have been the vehicle for the distribution of up to 123 terabytes of child pornography, which is roughly equivalent to 16,000 DVDs," making this the DHS's largest child porn bust in its history. Launched in 2009 by federal law enforcement, Operation Delego resulted in the arrest of 52 people in 14 countries of which are Canada, Denmark, Ecuador, France, Germany, Hungary, Kenya, the Netherlands, the Philippines, Qatar, Serbia, Sweden and Switzerland, according to United States Department of Justice Attorney General Eric Holder. Furthermore, according to federal agents, while Dreamboard's servers were located in Shreveport, Louisiana, the site's top administrators were in France and Canada.

== Convictions ==
A total of 72 individuals have been charged as a result of Operation Delego. To date, 57 of the 72 charged defendants have been arrested in the United States and abroad. 42 individuals have pleaded guilty. 25 of the 42 individuals who have pleaded guilty for their roles in the conspiracy have been sentenced to prison and have received sentences ranging between 10 years and life in prison. 15 of the 72 charged individuals remain at large and are known only by their online identities. Efforts to identify and apprehend these individuals continue.

=== Timeline ===
- On May 10, 2011, Timothy Lee Gentry, 33, of Burlington, Ky., was sentenced to 25 years in prison.
- On May 31, 2011, Michael Biggs, 32, of Orlando, Fla., was sentenced to 20 years in prison.
- On June 22, 2011, Michael Childs, 49, of Huntsville, Ala., was sentenced to 30 years in prison.
- On June 29, 2011, Christopher Luke, 31, of Tonawanda, NY, was sentenced to 20 years in prison for engaging in a child exploitation enterprise.
- On July 14, 2011, Charles Christian, 49, of Tilton, Ill., was sentenced to more than 22 years in prison.
- On July 17, 2012, Robert Cuff, 49, was sentenced to life in prison for producing and distributing child pornography.
- Jonathan Mayer, 29, of Newport, Tenn., and Shane Micah Turner, 33, of Roy, Utah, were sentenced in connection with their participation in the Dreamboard bulletin board. Each received a sentence of 17 ½ years in prison followed by lifetime supervised release, as a result of both defendants pleading guilty to conspiring to advertise child pornography. The sentences were handed down by U.S. District Judge S. Maurice Hicks.
- On May 17, 2012 John Wyss, aka "Bones," 55, of Monroe, Wisconsin, was found guilty, after a four-day jury trial, of one count of engaging in a child exploitation enterprise, one count of conspiracy to advertise child pornography and one count of conspiracy to distribute child pornography. In September 2012 Wyss was sentenced to life in prison.
- On January 8, 2013, David Ettlinger, aka "ee1", 35, of Newton, Massachusetts was sentenced to serve 45 years in prison. In addition to his prison term, Ettlinger was sentenced to lifetime supervised release.
- On July 29, 2013, the final two defendants, of those arrested thus far, in the Dreamboard child exploitation and child pornography ring were sentenced to federal prison.
- Christopher Blackford, 28, of Charleston, S.C., was sentenced to 22 years in federal prison before U.S. District Court Judge S. Maurice Hicks in the Western District of Louisiana. In addition to his prison sentence, Blackford faces a lifetime of supervised release. Blackford admitted in his April guilty plea that he joined Dreamboard in December 2009 and contributed 84 posts to the online bulletin board that contained child pornography.
- William Davis, 39, of Bristol, N.H., was sentenced to more than 17 years in federal prison in addition to a lifetime of supervised release. Davis admitted in his April guilty plea that he posted advertisements offering to distribute child pornography to other members of the board.
