= Carl Upchurch =

American activist, author and educator

Carl Douglass Upchurch (1950, Philadelphia – May 2, 2003, Bexley, Ohio) was an American activist, author and educator. His commitment to education, civic and urban issues, and political justice earned him a national reputation.

He was portrayed by Omar Epps in the 2002 film Conviction.

== Works ==
- Convicted in the Womb, Bantam Books, 1996. ISBN 978-0-553-37520-6
