= List of nuclear weapons tests of the Soviet Union =

The nuclear weapons tests of the Soviet Union were performed between 1949 and 1990 as part of the nuclear arms race. The Soviet Union conducted 715 nuclear tests using 969 total devices by official count, including 219 atmospheric, underwater, and space tests and 124 peaceful use tests. Most of the tests took place at the Southern Test Site in Semipalatinsk, Kazakhstan and the Northern Test Site at Novaya Zemlya. Other tests took place at various locations within the Soviet Union, including now-independent Kazakhstan, Uzbekistan, Ukraine and Turkmenistan.

== List ==
Soviet Union's nuclear testing series summary - Link to world summary of nuclear weapons tests
Series or years	Years covered	Tests (Note: Includes all tests with potential for nuclear fission or fusion explosion, including combat use, singleton tests, salvo tests, zero yield fails, safety experiments, and bombs incapacitated by accidents but still intended to be fired. It does not include hydronuclear and subcritical tests, and misfires of a device which was subsequently fired successfully.)	Devices fired	Devices with unknown yield	Peaceful use tests	Non-PTBT tests (Note: Number of tests which would have been in violation of the Partial Test Ban Treaty of 1963, such as atmospheric, space or underwater tests. Some "peaceful use" cratering tests which should have been violations were protested, and later quietly dropped.)	Yield range (kilotons) (Note: "Small" refers to a value greater than zero but less than 0.5 kt.)	Total yield (kilotons) (Note: Some yields are described like "< 20 kt"; such are scored at one half of the numeric amount, i.e., yield of 10k in this example. "Unknown yield" adds nothing to the total.)	Notes
1949–1951	1949–1951	3	3			3	22 to 42	102	There were no Soviet tests in 1950.
1953	1953	5	5			5	2 to 400	440	
1954	1954	10	10			10	small to 62	122	
1955	1955	7	7			7	0 to 1,600	1,868	
1956	1956	9	9			9	small to 900	1,976	
1957	1957	16	16			16	small to 2,900	6,239	
1958	1958	36	36			36	0 to 2,900	16,252	1959 and 1960 have no testing, a bilateral moratorium between the USSR and the US, officially beginning 31 Oct 1958.
1961	1961	57	57			56	small to 50,000	87,702	The USSR ended its participation in the voluntary testing moratorium on 1 September 1961.
K project	1961–1962	5	5			5	1 to 300	902	
1962	1962	78	78			77	small to 24,200	140,662	The Soviets executed no tests in 1963.
1964	1964	9	9		2		small to 47	167	
1965	1965	14	15		6	2	small to 140	343	
1966	1966	18	19	3	9		1 to 700	1,954	
1967	1967	17	23	6	5		small to 260	657	
1968	1968	17	23	2	7	2	small to 165	585	
1969	1969	19	24	9	9		6 to 540	906	
1970	1970	16	21	7	7		small to 2,200	2,625	
1971	1971	23	29	6	8	1	small to 2,450	2,926	
1972	1972	24	31	8	9		small to 1,120	1,646	
1973	1973	17	22	5	6		small to 4,000	8,409	
1974	1974	21	27	6	7		small to 2,300	3,750	
1975	1975	19	35	17	4		small to 1,300	4,481	
1976	1976	21	27	6	3		small to 130	629	
1977	1977	24	36	13	7		small to 120	552	
1978	1978	31	55	21	9		small to 180	1,290	
1979	1979	31	52	17	9		small to 150	1,474	
1980	1980	24	43	21	5		small to 200	847	
1981	1981	21	37	16	5		small to 150	828	
1982	1982	20	35	13	8		2 to 145	1,539	
1983	1983	27	39	14	10		0 to 150	778	
1984	1984	29	45	15	11		1 to 150	1,330	
1985	1985	10	19	10	2		1 to 114	426	There was no Soviet testing in 1986.
1987	1987	24	40	16	6		0 to 150	1,145	
1988	1988	16	29	9	2		small to 150	905	
1989	1989	7	11	4			4 to 118	308	
1990	1990	2	9	4			0 to 70	70	The USSR announced Soviet ratification of the Comprehensive Nuclear Test Ban Treaty, and ended testing on 24 October 1990.
Totals	1949-Aug-29 to 1991-May-01	727	981	248	156	229	0 to 50,000	296,837	Total country yield is 54.9% of all nuclear testing.

== See also ==
- List of nuclear weapons tests

== Sources ==
- Yang, Xiaoping; North, Robert; Romney, Carl (August 2000). "CMR Nuclear Explosion Database (Revision 3)" (Document). SMDC Monitoring Research.
- Andryushi, LA; Voloshin, N.P.; Ilkaev, R.I.; Matushchenko, A.M.; Ryabev, L.D.; Strukov, V.G.; Chernyshev, A.K.; Yudin, Yu.A. Mikhailov, V.N. (ed.). "Catalog of Worldwide Nuclear Testing". Archived from the original on 2013-12-19.
- Wm Robert Johnston, PhD. "Johnston Archive of Nuclear Weapons".
