= 1972 Soviet nuclear tests =

1972
- Nuclear blast animation

Information
- Country: Soviet Union
- Test site: Balapan, Semipalatinsk, Kazakhstan; Degelen, Semipalatinsk, Kazakhstan; Kharkiv, Ukraine; Kostanay, Kazakhstan; Murmansk, Russia; NZ Area A, Chyornaya Guba, Novaya Zemlya, Russia; NZ Area B, Matochkin Shar, Novaya Zemlya, Russia; Orenburg, Russia; Sary-Uzen/Murzhik, Semipalatinsk, Kazakhstan; Turkmenistan
- Period: 1972
- Number of tests: 23
- Test type: underground shaft, tunnel
- Max. yield: 1.1 megatonnes of TNT (4.6 PJ)

Test series chronology

The Soviet Union's 1972 nuclear test series was a group of 24 nuclear tests conducted in 1972. These tests (Note: A bomb test may be a salvo test, defined as two or more explosions "where a period of time between successive individual explosions does not exceed 5 seconds and where the burial points of all explosive devices can be connected by segments of straight lines, each of them connecting two burial points and does not exceed 40 kilometers in length". Mikhailov, V. N. "Catalog of World Wide Nuclear Testing". Begell-Atom, LLC. Archived from the original on 2014-04-26.) followed the 1971 Soviet nuclear tests series and preceded the 1973 Soviet nuclear tests series.

Soviet Union's 1972 series tests and detonations
Name (Note: The US, France and Great Britain have code-named their test events, while the USSR and China did not, and therefore have only test numbers (with some exceptions – Soviet peaceful explosions were named). Word translations into English in parentheses unless the name is a proper noun. A dash followed by a number indicates a member of a salvo event. The US also sometimes named the individual explosions in such a salvo test, which results in "name1 – 1(with name2)". If test is canceled or aborted, then the row data like date and location discloses the intended plans, where known.)	Date time (UT)	Local time zone (Note: To convert the UT time into standard local, add the number of hours in parentheses to the UT time; for local daylight saving time, add one additional hour. If the result is earlier than 00:00, add 24 hours and subtract 1 from the day; if it is 24:00 or later, subtract 24 hours and add 1 to the day. v)	Location (Note: Rough place name and a latitude/longitude reference; for rocket-carried tests, the launch location is specified before the detonation location, if known. Some locations are extremely accurate; others (like airdrops and space blasts) may be quite inaccurate. "~" indicates a likely pro-forma rough location, shared with other tests in that same area.)	Elevation + height (Note: Elevation is the ground level at the point directly below the explosion relative to sea level; height is the additional distance added or subtracted by tower, balloon, shaft, tunnel, air drop or other contrivance. For rocket bursts the ground level is "N/A". In some cases it is not clear if the height is absolute or relative to ground, for example, Plumbbob/John. No number or units indicates the value is unknown, while "0" means zero. Sorting on this column is by elevation and height added together.)	Delivery, (Note: Atmospheric, airdrop, balloon, gun, cruise missile, rocket, surface, tower, and barge are all disallowed by the Partial Nuclear Test Ban Treaty. Sealed shaft and tunnel are underground, and remained useful under the PTBT. Intentional cratering tests are borderline; they occurred under the treaty, were sometimes protested, and generally overlooked if the test was declared to be a peaceful use.) Purpose (Note: Include weapons development, weapon effects, safety test, transport safety test, war, science, joint verification and industrial/peaceful, which may be further broken down.)	Device (Note: Designations for test items where known, "?" indicates some uncertainty about the preceding value, nicknames for particular devices in quotes. This category of information is often not officially disclosed.)	Yield (Note: Estimated energy yield in tons, kilotons, and megatons. A ton of TNT equivalent is defined as 4.184 gigajoules (1 gigacalorie).)	Fallout (Note: Radioactive emission to the atmosphere aside from prompt neutrons, where known. The measured species is only iodine-131 if mentioned, otherwise it is all species. No entry means unknown, probably none if underground and "all" if not; otherwise notation for whether measured on the site only or off the site, where known, and the measured amount of radioactivity released.)	References	Notes
355	10 February 1972 05:03:00.0	ALMT (6 hrs)	Balapan, Semipalatinsk, Kazakhstan: 1007 50.02495°N 78.87728°E	330 m (1,080 ft) +	underground shaft, weapons development		16 kt	Venting detected		
356 - 1	10 March 1972 04:56:59.8	ALMT (6 hrs)	Degelen, Semipalatinsk, Kazakhstan: 201 49.7453°N 78.1197°E	672 m (2,205 ft) +	tunnel, weapons development		28 kt			
356 - 2	10 March 1972 04:56:59.8	ALMT (6 hrs)	Degelen, Semipalatinsk, Kazakhstan: 201 49.7453°N 78.1197°E	672 m (2,205 ft) +	tunnel, weapons development		unknown yield			
357 - 1	28 March 1972 04:22:00.1	ALMT (6 hrs)	Degelen, Semipalatinsk, Kazakhstan: 191 49.7331°N 78.0757°E	655 m (2,149 ft) +	tunnel, weapons development		6 kt			
357 - 2	28 March 1972 04:22:00.1	ALMT (6 hrs)	Degelen, Semipalatinsk, Kazakhstan: 191 49.7331°N 78.0757°E	655 m (2,149 ft) +	tunnel, peaceful research		unknown yield			
357 - 3	28 March 1972 04:22:00.1	ALMT (6 hrs)	Degelen, Semipalatinsk, Kazakhstan: 191 49.7331°N 78.0757°E	655 m (2,149 ft) +	tunnel, safety experiment		1000 kg			
358 Krator (Crater)	11 April 1972 06:00:01.9	ASHT (5 hrs)	Turkmenistan: ? 36.56173°N 62.81352°E	– 1,720 m (5,640 ft)	underground shaft, extinguishing oil/gas fires		15 kt			Gas fire shaft closure.
359	20 April 1972	ALMT (6 hrs)	Degelen, Semipalatinsk, Kazakhstan: 505p 49.84352°N 78.10513°E	587 m (1,926 ft) +	tunnel, safety experiment		1000 kg			
360	7 June 1972 01:28:??	ALMT (6 hrs)	Degelen, Semipalatinsk, Kazakhstan: 110 49.8267°N 78.1155°E	618 m (2,028 ft) +	tunnel, weapons development		unknown yield			
361	7 June 1972 01:28:00.0	ALMT (6 hrs)	Degelen, Semipalatinsk, Kazakhstan: 601 49.77091°N 77.9914°E	620 m (2,030 ft) +	tunnel, weapon effect		25 kt			
362	6 July 1972 01:03:00.0	ALMT (6 hrs)	Degelen, Semipalatinsk, Kazakhstan: 157-M 49.7375°N 78.1101°E	650 m (2,130 ft) +	tunnel, weapon effect		1.5 kt			
363 Fakel (Torch)	9 July 1972 07:00:01.3	MSK (3 hrs)	Kharkiv, Ukraine: ? 49.47973°N 35.49465°E	– 2,483 m (8,146 ft)	underground shaft, extinguishing oil/gas fires		3.8 kt			Gas fire shaft closure. 15 km N Krasnodar, Ukraine.
364	27 July 1972 10:00:??	MSK (3 hrs)	NZ Area A, Chyornaya Guba, Novaya Zemlya, Russia: Yu-3 70.83°N 54.15°E	30 m (98 ft) +	underground shaft, fundamental science		10 kt			Did not register seismically; may have been a fizzle.
365	16 August 1972 03:16:59.8	ALMT (6 hrs)	Degelen, Semipalatinsk, Kazakhstan: 708 49.7655°N 78.0588°E	555 m (1,821 ft) +	tunnel, weapon effect		8 kt			
367	26 August 1972 03:46:59.7	ALMT (6 hrs)	Sary-Uzen/Murzhik, Semipalatinsk, Kazakhstan: 132 49.98233°N 77.71601°E	460 m (1,510 ft) +	underground shaft, weapons development		21 kt			
368 - 1	28 August 1972 05:59:56.87	MSK (3 hrs)	NZ Area B, Matochkin Shar, Novaya Zemlya, Russia: A-16 73.388°N 54.847°E	100 m (330 ft) – 900 m (3,000 ft)	tunnel, weapons development		1.1 Mt	Venting detected off site, 1 MCi (37 PBq)		
368 - 2	28 August 1972 05:59:56.9	MSK (3 hrs)	NZ Area B, Matochkin Shar, Novaya Zemlya, Russia: A-16 73.388°N 54.847°E	100 m (330 ft) +	tunnel, weapons development		unknown yield			
368 - 3	28 August 1972 05:59:56.9	MSK (3 hrs)	NZ Area B, Matochkin Shar, Novaya Zemlya, Russia: A-16 73.388°N 54.847°E	100 m (330 ft) +	tunnel, weapons development		unknown yield			
368 - 4	28 August 1972 05:59:56.9	MSK (3 hrs)	NZ Area B, Matochkin Shar, Novaya Zemlya, Russia: A-16 73.388°N 54.847°E	100 m (330 ft) +	tunnel, weapons development		unknown yield			
369	2 September 1972 08:56:59.9	ALMT (6 hrs)	Sary-Uzen/Murzhik, Semipalatinsk, Kazakhstan: 128 49.96002°N 77.64146°E	460 m (1,510 ft) +	underground shaft, weapons development		2 kt			
370 Dnepr 1	4 September 1972 07:00:00.0	MSK (3 hrs)	Murmansk, Russia: Dnepr-1 67.79105°N 33.60823°E	– 130 m (430 ft)	tunnel, industrial		2.1 kt			Ore crushing technology. Used methods developed in shots 366 and 415 to keep radioactivity out of broken ore body.
371 Region 1	21 September 1972 09:00:00.3	SVET (5 hrs)	Orenburg, Russia: R-1 52.118°N 52.068°E	– 490 m (1,610 ft)	underground shaft, seismic sounding		2.3 kt			Seismic probing program. 21 km SSW Buzuluk.
373	2 November 1972 01:27:00.2	ALMT (6 hrs)	Balapan, Semipalatinsk, Kazakhstan: 1061 49.92697°N 78.81725°E	330 m (1,080 ft) +	underground shaft, weapons development		165 kt			
374 Region 2	24 November 1972 09:00:00.0	SVET (5 hrs)	Orenburg, Russia: R-2 51.99°N 51.867°E	– 680 m (2,230 ft)	underground shaft, seismic sounding		2.3 kt			Seismic probing program. 90 km SSW Buzuluk.
375 Region 5	24 November 1972 10:00:00.2	ALMT (6 hrs)	Kostanay, Kazakhstan: R-5 51.84143°N 64.21328°E	– 425 m (1,394 ft)	underground shaft, seismic sounding		6.6 kt			Seismic probing program. 170 km SSE Kustonay.
376 - 1	10 December 1972 04:27:00.0	ALMT (6 hrs)	Degelen, Semipalatinsk, Kazakhstan: Z-2 49.82353°N 78.07857°E	660 m (2,170 ft) +	tunnel, weapons development		58 kt			
376 - 2	10 December 1972 04:27:00	ALMT (6 hrs)	Degelen, Semipalatinsk, Kazakhstan: 140 49.8194°N 78.0582°E	646 m (2,119 ft) +	tunnel, weapons development		unknown yield			
377	10 December 1972 04:27:10.0	ALMT (6 hrs)	Balapan, Semipalatinsk, Kazakhstan: 1204 50.02772°N 78.99545°E	330 m (1,080 ft) – 378 m (1,240 ft)	underground shaft, peaceful research		140 kt	Venting detected		
378	28 December 1972 04:27:00.0	ALMT (6 hrs)	Degelen, Semipalatinsk, Kazakhstan: 25pp 49.74209°N 78.10206°E	739 m (2,425 ft) +	tunnel, weapons development		unknown yield			
