= 1967 Soviet nuclear tests =

1967 Soviet Union nuclear bomb tests

1967
- Nuclear blast animation

Information
- Country: Soviet Union
- Test site: Degelen, Semipalatinsk, Kazakhstan; NZ Area B, Matochkin Shar, Novaya Zemlya, Russia; Sary-Uzen/Murzhik, Semipalatinsk, Kazakhstan; Tyumen, Russia
- Period: 1967
- Number of tests: 17
- Test type: underground shaft, tunnel
- Max. yield: 260 kilotonnes of TNT (1,100 TJ)

Test series chronology

The Soviet Union's 1967 nuclear test series was a group of 17 nuclear tests conducted in 1967. These tests (Note: A bomb test may be a salvo test, defined as two or more explosions "where a period of time between successive individual explosions does not exceed 5 seconds and where the burial points of all explosive devices can be connected by segments of straight lines, each of them connecting two burial points and does not exceed 40 kilometers in length". Mikhailov, V. N. "Catalog of World Wide Nuclear Testing". Begell-Atom, LLC. Archived from the original on 2014-04-26.) followed the 1966 Soviet nuclear tests series and preceded the 1968 Soviet nuclear tests series.

Soviet Union's 1967 series tests and detonations
Name (Note: The US, France and Great Britain have code-named their test events, while the USSR and China did not, and therefore have only test numbers (with some exceptions – Soviet peaceful explosions were named). Word translations into English in parentheses unless the name is a proper noun. A dash followed by a number indicates a member of a salvo event. The US also sometimes named the individual explosions in such a salvo test, which results in "name1 – 1(with name2)". If test is canceled or aborted, then the row data like date and location discloses the intended plans, where known.)	Date time (UT)	Local time zone (Note: To convert the UT time into standard local, add the number of hours in parentheses to the UT time; for local daylight saving time, add one additional hour. If the result is earlier than 00:00, add 24 hours and subtract 1 from the day; if it is 24:00 or later, subtract 24 hours and add 1 to the day. Historical time zone data obtained from the IANA time zone database.)	Location (Note: Rough place name and a latitude/longitude reference; for rocket-carried tests, the launch location is specified before the detonation location, if known. Some locations are extremely accurate; others (like airdrops and space blasts) may be quite inaccurate. "~" indicates a likely pro-forma rough location, shared with other tests in that same area.)	Elevation + height (Note: Elevation is the ground level at the point directly below the explosion relative to sea level; height is the additional distance added or subtracted by tower, balloon, shaft, tunnel, air drop or other contrivance. For rocket bursts the ground level is "N/A". In some cases it is not clear if the height is absolute or relative to ground, for example, Plumbbob/John. No number or units indicates the value is unknown, while "0" means zero. Sorting on this column is by elevation and height added together.)	Delivery, (Note: Atmospheric, airdrop, balloon, gun, cruise missile, rocket, surface, tower, and barge are all disallowed by the Partial Nuclear Test Ban Treaty. Sealed shaft and tunnel are underground, and remained useful under the PTBT. Intentional cratering tests are borderline; they occurred under the treaty, were sometimes protested, and generally overlooked if the test was declared to be a peaceful use.) Purpose (Note: Include weapons development, weapon effects, safety test, transport safety test, war, science, joint verification and industrial/peaceful, which may be further broken down.)	Device (Note: Designations for test items where known, "?" indicates some uncertainty about the preceding value, nicknames for particular devices in quotes. This category of information is often not officially disclosed.)	Yield (Note: Estimated energy yield in tons, kilotons, and megatons. A ton of TNT equivalent is defined as 4.184 gigajoules (1 gigacalorie).)	Fallout (Note: Radioactive emission to the atmosphere aside from prompt neutrons, where known. The measured species is only iodine-131 if mentioned, otherwise it is all species. No entry means unknown, probably none if underground and "all" if not; otherwise notation for whether measured on the site only or off the site, where known, and the measured amount of radioactivity released.)	References	Notes
263 - 1	30 January 1967 04:01:59.5	ALMT (6 hrs)	Degelen, Semipalatinsk, Kazakhstan: 611 49.7674°N 77.9914°E	727 m (2,385 ft) +	tunnel, weapons development		4.6 kt			
263 - 2	30 January 1967 04:01:59.5	ALMT (6 hrs)	Degelen, Semipalatinsk, Kazakhstan: 611 49.7674°N 77.9914°E	727 m (2,385 ft) +	tunnel, weapons development		unknown yield			
264	26 February 1967 03:57:59.8	ALMT (6 hrs)	Degelen, Semipalatinsk, Kazakhstan: 21 49.7457°N 78.0823°E	676 m (2,218 ft) +	tunnel, fundamental science		130 kt			
265 - 1	25 March 1967 05:58:01.1	ALMT (6 hrs)	Degelen, Semipalatinsk, Kazakhstan: 19 49.7536°N 78.063°E	728 m (2,388 ft) +	tunnel, weapons development		18 kt			
265 - 2	25 March 1967 05:58:01.1	ALMT (6 hrs)	Degelen, Semipalatinsk, Kazakhstan: 19 49.7536°N 78.063°E	728 m (2,388 ft) +	tunnel, weapon effect		unknown yield			
266	20 April 1967 04:08:00.0	ALMT (6 hrs)	Degelen, Semipalatinsk, Kazakhstan: 25p 49.7416°N 78.1054°E	739 m (2,425 ft) +	tunnel, peaceful research		37 kt			
267 - 1	28 May 1967 04:07:59.6	ALMT (6 hrs)	Degelen, Semipalatinsk, Kazakhstan: 11p 49.7564°N 78.0169°E	765 m (2,510 ft) +	tunnel, peaceful research		28 kt	Venting detected		
267 - 2	28 May 1967 04:07:59.6	ALMT (6 hrs)	Degelen, Semipalatinsk, Kazakhstan: 11p 49.7564°N 78.0169°E	765 m (2,510 ft) +	tunnel, peaceful research		unknown yield	Venting detected		
268	29 June 1967 02:56:59.9	ALMT (6 hrs)	Degelen, Semipalatinsk, Kazakhstan: 703 49.8167°N 78.049°E	653 m (2,142 ft) +	tunnel, weapons development		20 kt			
269	15 July 1967 03:26:59.9	ALMT (6 hrs)	Degelen, Semipalatinsk, Kazakhstan: 506 49.8359°N 78.1182°E	580 m (1,900 ft) +	tunnel, peaceful research		23 kt			
270 - 1	4 August 1967 06:58:00.3	ALMT (6 hrs)	Degelen, Semipalatinsk, Kazakhstan: 18 49.7603°N 78.0555°E	537 m (1,762 ft) +	tunnel, weapons development		19 kt			
270 - 2	4 August 1967 06:58:00.3	ALMT (6 hrs)	Degelen, Semipalatinsk, Kazakhstan: 18 49.7603°N 78.0555°E	537 m (1,762 ft) +	tunnel, weapons development		unknown yield			
271	2 September 1967 04:04:00.0	ALMT (6 hrs)	Degelen, Semipalatinsk, Kazakhstan: 13p 49.74487°N 78.02234°E	721 m (2,365 ft) +	tunnel, weapons development		700 t			
272	16 September 1967 04:04:00.3	ALMT (6 hrs)	Sary-Uzen/Murzhik, Semipalatinsk, Kazakhstan: 102 49.93769°N 77.72794°E	460 m (1,510 ft) +	underground shaft, weapons development		16 kt			
273	22 September 1967 05:03:59.0	ALMT (6 hrs)	Sary-Uzen/Murzhik, Semipalatinsk, Kazakhstan: 105 49.96006°N 77.69059°E	460 m (1,510 ft) +	underground shaft, weapons development		10 kt			
274 Tavda	6 October 1967 06:59:57.5	SVET (5 hrs)	Tyumen, Russia: Tavda sft 57.69°N 65.27°E	– 170 m (560 ft)	underground shaft, cavity excavation		300 t			
275 - 1	17 October 1967 05:04:00.2	ALMT (6 hrs)	Degelen, Semipalatinsk, Kazakhstan: B 49.7809°N 78.0038°E	698 m (2,290 ft) +	tunnel, peaceful research		45 kt			
275 - 2	17 October 1967 05:04:00.2	ALMT (6 hrs)	Degelen, Semipalatinsk, Kazakhstan: B 49.7809°N 78.0038°E	698 m (2,290 ft) +	tunnel, peaceful research		unknown yield			
276 - 1	21 October 1967 04:59:58.49	MSK (3 hrs)	NZ Area B, Matochkin Shar, Novaya Zemlya, Russia: A-4 73.39°N 54.81°E	100 m (330 ft) – 600 m (2,000 ft)	tunnel, weapons development		260 kt	Venting detected on site, 10 Ci (370 GBq)		
276 - 2	21 October 1967 04:59:59	MSK (3 hrs)	NZ Area B, Matochkin Shar, Novaya Zemlya, Russia: A-5 73.39°N 54.81°E	100 m (330 ft) – 500 m (1,600 ft)	tunnel, weapons development		unknown yield			
277	30 October 1967 06:04:00.0	ALMT (6 hrs)	Degelen, Semipalatinsk, Kazakhstan: 501 49.7944°N 78.0079°E	670 m (2,200 ft) +	tunnel, weapons development		25 kt			
278	22 November 1967 04:03:59.9	ALMT (6 hrs)	Sary-Uzen/Murzhik, Semipalatinsk, Kazakhstan: 106 49.94238°N 77.68593°E	460 m (1,510 ft) +	underground shaft, weapons development		1.6 kt			
279	8 December 1967 06:03:59.8	ALMT (6 hrs)	Degelen, Semipalatinsk, Kazakhstan: 507 49.8171°N 78.1638°E	504 m (1,654 ft) +	tunnel, weapons development		19 kt			
