= 1973 Soviet nuclear tests =

1973
- Nuclear blast animation

Information
- Country: Soviet Union
- Test site: Balapan, Semipalatinsk, Kazakhstan; Bashkortostan, Russia; Degelen, Semipalatinsk, Kazakhstan; NZ Area A, Chyornaya Guba, Novaya Zemlya, Russia; NZ Area B, Matochkin Shar, Novaya Zemlya, Russia; Orenburg, Russia; Sary-Uzen/Murzhik, Semipalatinsk.
- Period: 1973
- Number of tests: 17
- Test type: underground shaft, tunnel
- Max. yield: 4 megatonnes of TNT (17 PJ)

Test series chronology

The Soviet Union's 1973 nuclear test series was a group of 17 nuclear tests conducted in 1973. These tests (Note: A bomb test may be a salvo test, defined as two or more explosions "where a period of time between successive individual explosions does not exceed 5 seconds and where the burial points of all explosive devices can be connected by segments of straight lines, each of them connecting two burial points and does not exceed 40 kilometers in length". Mikhailov, V. N. (ed.). "Catalog of World Wide Nuclear Testing". Begell-Atom, LLC. Archived from the original on 2014-04-26.) followed the 1972 Soviet nuclear tests series and preceded the 1974 Soviet nuclear tests series.

Soviet Union's 1973 series tests and detonations
Name (Note: The US, France and Great Britain have code-named their test events, while the USSR and China did not, and therefore have only test numbers (with some exceptions – Soviet peaceful explosions were named). Word translations into English in parentheses unless the name is a proper noun. A dash followed by a number indicates a member of a salvo event. The US also sometimes named the individual explosions in such a salvo test, which results in "name1 – 1(with name2)". If test is canceled or aborted, then the row data like date and location discloses the intended plans, where known.)	Date time (UT)	Local time zone (Note: To convert the UT time into standard local, add the number of hours in parentheses to the UT time; for local daylight saving time, add one additional hour. If the result is earlier than 00:00, add 24 hours and subtract 1 from the day; if it is 24:00 or later, subtract 24 hours and add 1 to the day. Historical time zone data obtained from the IANA time zone database.)	Location (Note: Rough place name and a latitude/longitude reference; for rocket-carried tests, the launch location is specified before the detonation location, if known. Some locations are extremely accurate; others (like airdrops and space blasts) may be quite inaccurate. "~" indicates a likely pro-forma rough location, shared with other tests in that same area.)	Elevation + height (Note: Elevation is the ground level at the point directly below the explosion relative to sea level; height is the additional distance added or subtracted by tower, balloon, shaft, tunnel, air drop or other contrivance. For rocket bursts the ground level is "N/A". In some cases it is not clear if the height is absolute or relative to ground, for example, Plumbbob/John. No number or units indicates the value is unknown, while "0" means zero. Sorting on this column is by elevation and height added together.)	Delivery, (Note: Atmospheric, airdrop, balloon, gun, cruise missile, rocket, surface, tower, and barge are all disallowed by the Partial Nuclear Test Ban Treaty. Sealed shaft and tunnel are underground, and remained useful under the PTBT. Intentional cratering tests are borderline; they occurred under the treaty, were sometimes protested, and generally overlooked if the test was declared to be a peaceful use.) Purpose (Note: Include weapons development, weapon effects, safety test, transport safety test, war, science, joint verification and industrial/peaceful, which may be further broken down.)	Device (Note: Designations for test items where known, "?" indicates some uncertainty about the preceding value, nicknames for particular devices in quotes. This category of information is often not officially disclosed.)	Yield (Note: Estimated energy yield in tons, kilotons, and megatons. A ton of TNT equivalent is defined as 4.184 gigajoules (1 gigacalorie).)	Fallout (Note: Radioactive emission to the atmosphere aside from prompt neutrons, where known. The measured species is only iodine-131 if mentioned, otherwise it is all species. No entry means unknown, probably none if underground and "all" if not; otherwise notation for whether measured on the site only or off the site, where known, and the measured amount of radioactivity released.)	References	Notes				
379	16 February 1973 05:03:00.0	ALMT (6 hrs)	Degelen, Semipalatinsk, Kazakhstan: 113 49.8061°N 78.1034°E	768 m (2,520 ft) +	tunnel, weapons development		42 kt							
380	19 April 1973 04:32:59.92	ALMT (6 hrs)	Sary-Uzen/Murzhik, Semipalatinsk, Kazakhstan: 131 49.98442°N 77.62776°E	460 m (1,510 ft) +	underground shaft, weapons development		21 kt							
381 - 1	10 July 1973 01:27:00.15	ALMT (6 hrs)	Degelen, Semipalatinsk, Kazakhstan: 806 49.773°N 78.0451°E	684 m (2,244 ft) +	tunnel, weapons development		20 kt							
381 - 2	10 July 1973 01:27:00.2	ALMT (6 hrs)	Degelen, Semipalatinsk, Kazakhstan: 806 49.773°N 78.0451°E	684 m (2,244 ft) +	tunnel, weapons development		unknown yield							
381 - 3	10 July 1973 01:27:00.2	ALMT (6 hrs)	Degelen, Semipalatinsk, Kazakhstan: 806 49.773°N 78.0451°E	684 m (2,244 ft) +	tunnel, safety experiment		1000 kg							
382	23 July 1973 01:23:00.16	ALMT (6 hrs)	Balapan, Semipalatinsk, Kazakhstan: 1066 49.96889°N 78.8175°E	330 m (1,080 ft) – 465 m (1,526 ft)	underground shaft, peaceful research		212 kt	Venting detected			6.3 kt		6.3 kt	Seismic probing program. 110 km E Arkalyk.
385 - 1	12 September 1973 06:59:54.81	MSK (3 hrs)	NZ Area B, Matochkin Shar, Novaya Zemlya, Russia: V-1 or A-1 73.32819°N 54.97485°E	100 m (330 ft) – 1,500 m (4,900 ft)	tunnel, weapons development		3.8 Mt	Venting detected off site, 15 Ci (560 GBq)		This blast lead to a landslide of 80 million tons of rock on Novaya Zemlya.				
385 - 2	12 September 1973 06:59:54.8	MSK (3 hrs)	NZ Area B, Matochkin Shar, Novaya Zemlya, Russia: V-1 or A-1 73.32441°N 54.96204°E	100 m (330 ft) +	tunnel, weapons development		unknown yield							
385 - 3	12 September 1973 06:59:54.8	MSK (3 hrs)	NZ Area B, Matochkin Shar, Novaya Zemlya, Russia: V-1 or A-1 73.33105°N 54.98173°E	100 m (330 ft) +	tunnel, weapons development		unknown yield							
385 - 4	12 September 1973 06:59:54.8	MSK (3 hrs)	NZ Area B, Matochkin Shar, Novaya Zemlya, Russia: V-1 or A-1 73.32819°N 54.97485°E	100 m (330 ft) +	tunnel, weapons development		unknown yield				6.3 kt	Seismic probing program. 230 km SSE Dzheskazgan.		
387	20 September 1973	ALMT (6 hrs)	Balapan, Semipalatinsk, Kazakhstan: 1267 49.96167°N 78.85556°E	330 m (1,080 ft) +	underground shaft, weapons development		1000 kg							
388	27 September 1973 07:00:01.12	MSK (3 hrs)	NZ Area A, Chyornaya Guba, Novaya Zemlya, Russia: Yu-4 70.79267°N 53.83384°E	30 m (98 ft) – 880 m (2,890 ft)	underground shaft, fundamental science		180 kt	Venting detected, 10 Ci (370 GBq)						
389 Sapfir (Sapphire)	30 September 1973 05:00:00.4	SVET (5 hrs)	Orenburg, Russia: E-3 51.65132°N 54.55261°E	– 1,145 m (3,757 ft)	underground shaft, cavity excavation		10 kt			Seismic probing program.				
391	26 October 1973 04:27:00.14	ALMT (6 hrs)	Degelen, Semipalatinsk, Kazakhstan: 205 49.7469°N 78.132°E	575 m (1,886 ft) +	tunnel, weapon effect		15 kt							
390 Kama 2	26 October 1973 05:59:59.5	SVET (5 hrs)	Bashkortostan, Russia: Kama-2 53.65°N 55.4°E	– 2,030 m (6,660 ft)	underground shaft, cavity excavation		10 kt			Oil and chemical waste water burial.				
392	27 October 1973 07:00:00.61	MSK (3 hrs)	NZ Area A, Chyornaya Guba, Novaya Zemlya, Russia: Yu-1 70.84°N 54.05°E	30 m (98 ft) – 1,900 m (6,200 ft)	underground shaft, weapons development		4 Mt			Highest yield shaft explosion.				
393	4 November 1973 03:57:00.0	ALMT (6 hrs)	Balapan, Semipalatinsk, Kazakhstan: 1069 50.0685°N 78.93328°E	330 m (1,080 ft) +	underground shaft, weapons development		unknown yield	Venting detected						
394	14 December 1973 07:46:59.67	ALMT (6 hrs)	Balapan, Semipalatinsk, Kazakhstan: 1064 50.04826°N 78.98636°E	330 m (1,080 ft) +	underground shaft, weapons development		80 kt							
395	31 December 1973 04:03:00.0	ALMT (6 hrs)	Degelen, Semipalatinsk, Kazakhstan: 21p 49.74366°N 78.08362°E	676 m (2,218 ft) – 157 m (515 ft)	tunnel, weapons development		500 t							
