= 1971 Soviet nuclear tests =

Detonations of atomic bombs in the Eurasian country

1971

Information
- Country: Soviet Union
- Test site: Arkhangelsk, Russia; Atyrau, Kazakhstan; Balapan, Semipalatinsk, Kazakhstan; Degelen, Semipalatinsk, Kazakhstan; Ivanovo, Russia; Komi, Russia; NZ Area B, Matochkin Shar, Novaya Zemlya, Russia; Orenburg, Russia; Perm, Russia; Sary-Uzen/Murzhik, Semipalatinsk, Kazakhstan
- Period: 1971
- Number of tests: 23
- Test type: cratering, underground shaft, tunnel
- Max. yield: 2.4 megatonnes of TNT (10 PJ)

Test series chronology

The Soviet Union's 1971 nuclear test series was a group of 23 nuclear tests conducted in 1971. These tests (Note: A bomb test may be a salvo test, defined as two or more explosions "where a period of time between successive individual explosions does not exceed 5 seconds and where the burial points of all explosive devices can be connected by segments of straight lines, each of them connecting two burial points and does not exceed 40 kilometers in length". Mikhailov, V. N. "Catalog of World Wide Nuclear Testing". Begell-Atom, LLC. Archived from the original on 2014-04-26.) followed the 1970 Soviet nuclear tests series and preceded the 1972 Soviet nuclear tests series.

Soviet Union's 1971 series tests and detonations
Name (Note: The US, France and Great Britain have code-named their test events, while the USSR and China did not, and therefore have only test numbers (with some exceptions – Soviet peaceful explosions were named). Word translations into English in parentheses unless the name is a proper noun. A dash followed by a number indicates a member of a salvo event. The US also sometimes named the individual explosions in such a salvo test, which results in "name1 – 1(with name2)". If test is canceled or aborted, then the row data like date and location discloses the intended plans, where known.)	Date time (UT)	Local time zone (Note: To convert the UT time into standard local, add the number of hours in parentheses to the UT time; for local daylight saving time, add one additional hour. If the result is earlier than 00:00, add 24 hours and subtract 1 from the day; if it is 24:00 or later, subtract 24 hours and add 1 to the day. Historical time zone data obtained from the IANA time zone database.)	Location (Note: Rough place name and a latitude/longitude reference; for rocket-carried tests, the launch location is specified before the detonation location, if known. Some locations are extremely accurate; others (like airdrops and space blasts) may be quite inaccurate. "~" indicates a likely pro-forma rough location, shared with other tests in that same area.)	Elevation + height (Note: Elevation is the ground level at the point directly below the explosion relative to sea level; height is the additional distance added or subtracted by tower, balloon, shaft, tunnel, air drop or other contrivance. For rocket bursts the ground level is "N/A". In some cases it is not clear if the height is absolute or relative to ground, for example, Plumbbob/John. No number or units indicates the value is unknown, while "0" means zero. Sorting on this column is by elevation and height added together.)	Delivery, (Note: Atmospheric, airdrop, balloon, gun, cruise missile, rocket, surface, tower, and barge are all disallowed by the Partial Nuclear Test Ban Treaty. Sealed shaft and tunnel are underground, and remained useful under the PTBT. Intentional cratering tests are borderline; they occurred under the treaty, were sometimes protested, and generally overlooked if the test was declared to be a peaceful use.) Purpose (Note: Include weapons development, weapon effects, safety test, transport safety test, war, science, joint verification and industrial/peaceful, which may be further broken down.)	Device (Note: Designations for test items where known, "?" indicates some uncertainty about the preceding value, nicknames for particular devices in quotes. This category of information is often not officially disclosed.)	Yield (Note: Estimated energy yield in tons, kilotons, and megatons. A ton of TNT equivalent is defined as 4.184 gigajoules (1 gigacalorie).)	Fallout (Note: Radioactive emission to the atmosphere aside from prompt neutrons, where known. The measured species is only iodine-131 if mentioned, otherwise it is all species. No entry means unknown, probably none if underground and "all" if not; otherwise notation for whether measured on the site only or off the site, where known, and the measured amount of radioactivity released.)	References	Notes
332	29 January 1971 05:03:00.0	ALMT (6 hrs)	Degelen, Semipalatinsk, Kazakhstan: 114 49.80334°N 78.16045°E	657 m (2,156 ft) +	tunnel, weapon effect		1.8 kt			
333	22 March 1971 04:33:00.3	ALMT (6 hrs)	Degelen, Semipalatinsk, Kazakhstan: 510p 49.7985°N 78.109°E	656 m (2,152 ft) +	tunnel, peaceful research		67 kt			
334	22 March 1971 04:33:??	ALMT (6 hrs)	Degelen, Semipalatinsk, Kazakhstan: 807 49.77704°N 78.09342°E	601 m (1,972 ft) +	tunnel, weapons development		unknown yield			
335 Taiga - 1	23 March 1971 06:59:58.4	SVET (5 hrs)	Perm, Russia: 1B 61.30759°N 56.59926°E	– 128 m (420 ft)	cratering, earth moving		15 kt			Excavation for canal.
335 Taiga - 2	23 March 1971 06:59:58	SVET (5 hrs)	Perm, Russia: 2B 61.30621°N 56.59881°E	– 128 m (420 ft)	cratering, industrial		15 kt			Excavation for canal.
335 Taiga - 3	23 March 1971 06:59:58	SVET (5 hrs)	Perm, Russia: 3B 61.30472°N 56.59843°E	– 128 m (420 ft)	cratering, industrial		15 kt			Excavation for canal.
336	9 April 1971 02:33:00.0	ALMT (6 hrs)	Degelen, Semipalatinsk, Kazakhstan: 148/1 49.83145°N 78.03479°E	632 m (2,073 ft) +	tunnel, industrial		230 t			Tested a special device for keeping radioactivity from invading ore bodies when using a bomb to fracture them.
337	25 April 1971 03:32:59.9	ALMT (6 hrs)	Degelen, Semipalatinsk, Kazakhstan: 706 49.7685°N 78.0339°E	689 m (2,260 ft) +	tunnel, weapons development		90 kt			
338	25 May 1971 04:03:00.4	ALMT (6 hrs)	Degelen, Semipalatinsk, Kazakhstan: 119 49.8016°N 78.1388°E	761 m (2,497 ft) +	tunnel, weapons development		9 kt			
339	6 June 1971 04:02:59.7	ALMT (6 hrs)	Sary-Uzen/Murzhik, Semipalatinsk, Kazakhstan: 110 49.97599°N 77.65964°E	460 m (1,510 ft) +	underground shaft, weapons development		16 kt			
340	19 June 1971 04:04:00.1	ALMT (6 hrs)	Sary-Uzen/Murzhik, Semipalatinsk, Kazakhstan: 129 49.96946°N 77.64124°E	460 m (1,510 ft) +	underground shaft, weapons development		35 kt			
341	30 June 1971 03:56:59.8	ALMT (6 hrs)	Balapan, Semipalatinsk, Kazakhstan: 1056 49.94657°N 78.9797°E	330 m (1,080 ft) +	underground shaft, weapons development		5 kt			
342 Globus 4	2 July 1971 17:00:01.1	MSK (3 hrs)	Komi, Russia: GB-4 67.28486°N 63.46342°E	– 540 m (1,770 ft)	underground shaft, seismic sounding		2.3 kt			Seismic probing program.
343 Globus 3	10 July 1971 17:00:01.4	MSK (3 hrs)	Komi, Russia: GB-3 64.16663°N 55.26057°E	– 470 m (1,540 ft)	underground shaft, seismic sounding		2.3 kt			Seismic probing program.
344 Globus 1	19 September 1971 11:00:01.1	MSK (3 hrs)	Ivanovo, Russia: GB-1 57.508°N 42.643°E	– 610 m (2,000 ft)	underground shaft, seismic sounding		2.3 kt	Venting detected		Seismic probing program.
345 - 1	27 September 1971 05:59:55.75	MSK (3 hrs)	NZ Area B, Matochkin Shar, Novaya Zemlya, Russia: A-8 73.393°N 54.92°E	100 m (330 ft) – 1,200 m (3,900 ft)	tunnel, weapons development		2.5 Mt	Venting detected off site, 15 Ci (560 GBq)		
345 - 2	27 September 1971 05:59:55.8	MSK (3 hrs)	NZ Area B, Matochkin Shar, Novaya Zemlya, Russia: A-8 73.393°N 54.92°E	100 m (330 ft) +	tunnel, weapons development		unknown yield			
345 - 3	27 September 1971 05:59:55.8	MSK (3 hrs)	NZ Area B, Matochkin Shar, Novaya Zemlya, Russia: A-8 73.393°N 54.92°E	100 m (330 ft) +	tunnel, weapons development		unknown yield			
345 - 4	27 September 1971 05:59:55.8	MSK (3 hrs)	NZ Area B, Matochkin Shar, Novaya Zemlya, Russia: A-8 73.393°N 54.92°E	100 m (330 ft) +	tunnel, weapons development		unknown yield			
346 Globus 2	4 October 1971 10:00:00.1	MSK (3 hrs)	Arkhangelsk, Russia: GB-2 61.358°N 48.092°E	– 595 m (1,952 ft)	underground shaft, seismic sounding		2.3 kt			Seismic probing program.
347	9 October 1971 06:02:59.7	ALMT (6 hrs)	Sary-Uzen/Murzhik, Semipalatinsk, Kazakhstan: 111 49.97852°N 77.64117°E	460 m (1,510 ft) +	underground shaft, weapons development		12 kt	Venting detected		
348	21 October 1971 06:02:59.7	ALMT (6 hrs)	Sary-Uzen/Murzhik, Semipalatinsk, Kazakhstan: 127 49.9744°N 77.59698°E	460 m (1,510 ft) +	underground shaft, weapons development		23 kt			
349 Sapfir (Sapphire)	22 October 1971 05:00:01.0	SVET (5 hrs)	Orenburg, Russia: E-2 51.6°N 54.45°E	– 1,140 m (3,740 ft)	underground shaft, cavity excavation		15 kt			Create reservoirs for gas storage.
350 - 1	29 November 1971 06:02:59.9	ALMT (6 hrs)	Degelen, Semipalatinsk, Kazakhstan: 105 49.7434°N 78.0785°E	766 m (2,513 ft) +	tunnel, weapons development		28 kt			
350 - 2	29 November 1971 06:02:59.9	ALMT (6 hrs)	Degelen, Semipalatinsk, Kazakhstan: 105 49.7434°N 78.0785°E	766 m (2,513 ft) +	tunnel, weapons development		unknown yield			
351	15 December 1971 07:53:59.8	ALMT (6 hrs)	Degelen, Semipalatinsk, Kazakhstan: 157 49.8264°N 77.9973°E	691 m (2,267 ft) – 115 m (377 ft)	tunnel, weapon effect		6 kt			
352 Galit A3 (Halite)	22 December 1971 06:59:59.0	SHET (5 hrs)	Atyrau, Kazakhstan: A-III 47.872°N 48.222°E	– 987 m (3,238 ft)	underground shaft, industrial		64 kt			Create reservoirs for gas storage; reused the cavity for test #437.
353	30 December 1971 06:21:00.2	ALMT (6 hrs)	Degelen, Semipalatinsk, Kazakhstan: 809 49.76°N 78.0371°E	714 m (2,343 ft) +	tunnel, weapons development		50 kt			
354	30 December 1971 06:21:??	ALMT (6 hrs)	Degelen, Semipalatinsk, Kazakhstan: 609 49.75729°N 78.04214°E	715 m (2,346 ft) +	tunnel, weapons development		unknown yield			
