= 1965 Soviet nuclear tests =

1965 Soviet Union nuclear bomb tests

1965
- Nuclear blast animation

Information
- Country: Soviet Union
- Test site: Balapan, Semipalatinsk, Kazakhstan; Bashkortostan, Russia; Degelen, Semipalatinsk, Kazakhstan; Sary-Uzen/Murzhik, Semipalatinsk, Kazakhstan
- Period: 1965
- Number of tests: 14
- Test type: cratering, underground shaft, tunnel
- Max. yield: 140 kilotonnes of TNT (590 TJ)

Test series chronology

The Soviet Union's 1965 nuclear test series was a group of 14 nuclear tests conducted in 1965. These tests (Note: A bomb test may be a salvo test, defined as two or more explosions "where a period of time between successive individual explosions does not exceed 5 seconds and where the burial points of all explosive devices can be connected by segments of straight lines, each of them connecting two burial points and does not exceed 40 kilometers in length". Mikhailov, V. N. "Catalog of World Wide Nuclear Testing". Begell-Atom, LLC. Archived from the original on 2014-04-26.) followed the 1964 Soviet nuclear tests series and preceded the 1966 Soviet nuclear tests series.

Soviet Union's 1965 series tests and detonations
Name (Note: The US, France and Great Britain have code-named their test events, while the USSR and China did not, and therefore have only test numbers (with some exceptions – Soviet peaceful explosions were named). Word translations into English in parentheses unless the name is a proper noun. A dash followed by a number indicates a member of a salvo event. The US also sometimes named the individual explosions in such a salvo test, which results in "name1 – 1(with name2)". If test is canceled or aborted, then the row data like date and location discloses the intended plans, where known.)	Date time (UT)	Local time zone (Note: To convert the UT time into standard local, add the number of hours in parentheses to the UT time; for local daylight saving time, add one additional hour. If the result is earlier than 00:00, add 24 hours and subtract 1 from the day; if it is 24:00 or later, subtract 24 hours and add 1 to the day. Historical time zone data obtained from the IANA time zone database.)	Location (Note: Rough place name and a latitude/longitude reference; for rocket-carried tests, the launch location is specified before the detonation location, if known. Some locations are extremely accurate; others (like airdrops and space blasts) may be quite inaccurate. "~" indicates a likely pro-forma rough location, shared with other tests in that same area.)	Elevation + height (Note: Elevation is the ground level at the point directly below the explosion relative to sea level; height is the additional distance added or subtracted by tower, balloon, shaft, tunnel, air drop or other contrivance. For rocket bursts the ground level is "N/A". In some cases it is not clear if the height is absolute or relative to ground, for example, Plumbbob/John. No number or units indicates the value is unknown, while "0" means zero. Sorting on this column is by elevation and height added together.)	Delivery, (Note: Atmospheric, airdrop, balloon, gun, cruise missile, rocket, surface, tower, and barge are all disallowed by the Partial Nuclear Test Ban Treaty. Sealed shaft and tunnel are underground, and remained useful under the PTBT. Intentional cratering tests are borderline; they occurred under the treaty, were sometimes protested, and generally overlooked if the test was declared to be a peaceful use.) Purpose (Note: Include weapons development, weapon effects, safety test, transport safety test, war, science, joint verification and industrial/peaceful, which may be further broken down.)	Device (Note: Designations for test items where known, "?" indicates some uncertainty about the preceding value, nicknames for particular devices in quotes. This category of information is often not officially disclosed.)	Yield (Note: Estimated energy yield in tons, kilotons, and megatons. A ton of TNT equivalent is defined as 4.184 gigajoules (1 gigacalorie).)	Fallout (Note: Radioactive emission to the atmosphere aside from prompt neutrons, where known. The measured species is only iodine-131 if mentioned, otherwise it is all species. No entry means unknown, probably none if underground and "all" if not; otherwise notation for whether measured on the site only or off the site, where known, and the measured amount of radioactivity released.)	References	Notes
231 Chagan	15 January 1965 06:00:00.8	ALMT (6 hrs)	Balapan, Semipalatinsk, Kazakhstan: 1004 49.9354°N 79.008473°E	330 m (1,080 ft) – 178 m (584 ft)	cratering, earth moving		140 kt			Equivalent to US Sedan experiment, first Soviet industrial use of nuclear force. The crater and a backup impoundment became Lake Chagan or Balapin, crater 408 m × 100 m (1,339 ft × 328 ft).
232	4 February 1965 06:00:00.0	ALMT (6 hrs)	Degelen, Semipalatinsk, Kazakhstan: A 49.77238°N 77.99428°E	726 m (2,382 ft) – 262 m (860 ft)	tunnel, fundamental science		44 kt			
233	3 March 1965 06:14:59.4	ALMT (6 hrs)	Degelen, Semipalatinsk, Kazakhstan: Zh-3 49.8247°N 78.0527°E	625 m (2,051 ft) +	tunnel, weapons development		27 kt			
234	27 March 1965 06:30:00.0	ALMT (6 hrs)	Degelen, Semipalatinsk, Kazakhstan: V-2 or A-2p 49.77347°N 77.98465°E	700 m (2,300 ft) +	tunnel, weapons development		60 t			
235 Butan (Butane) - 1	30 March 1965 08:00:00.0	SVET (5 hrs)	Bashkortostan, Russia: 617 53.1134°N 55.85229°E	– 1,340 m (4,400 ft)	underground shaft, oil stimulation		2.3 kt			First salvo explosion in 2 shafts; oil recovery intensification.
235 Butan (Butane) - 2	30 March 1965 08:00:00	SVET (5 hrs)	Bashkortostan, Russia: 618 53.1134°N 55.85029°E	– 1,375 m (4,511 ft)	underground shaft, oil stimulation		2.3 kt			
236	11 May 1965 06:40:00.2	ALMT (6 hrs)	Degelen, Semipalatinsk, Kazakhstan: A-p? 49.7702°N 77.9943°E	726 m (2,382 ft) +	tunnel, weapons development		14 kt			
237 Butan (Butane)	10 June 1965 07:00:00.0	SVET (5 hrs)	Bashkortostan, Russia: 622 53.1104°N 55.85029°E	– 1,350 m (4,430 ft)	underground shaft, oil stimulation		7.6 kt			Oil recovery intensification.
238	17 June 1965 03:45:00.0	ALMT (6 hrs)	Degelen, Semipalatinsk, Kazakhstan: Zh-1 49.8284°N 78.0669°E	630 m (2,070 ft) +	tunnel, peaceful research		24 kt			
239	29 July 1965 03:05:00.2	ALMT (6 hrs)	Degelen, Semipalatinsk, Kazakhstan: A-1sh 49.7797°N 77.9981°E	700 m (2,300 ft) +	tunnel, fundamental science		1.1 kt			
240	17 September 1965 04:00:00.1	ALMT (6 hrs)	Degelen, Semipalatinsk, Kazakhstan: 1 49.8116°N 78.1467°E	685 m (2,247 ft) +	tunnel, weapons development		15 kt			
241	8 October 1965 06:00:00.4	ALMT (6 hrs)	Degelen, Semipalatinsk, Kazakhstan: Z-1 49.8259°N 78.1114°E	630 m (2,070 ft) +	tunnel, weapons development		29 kt			
242 Sary-Uzen	14 October 1965 04:00:00.2	ALMT (6 hrs)	Sary-Uzen/Murzhik, Semipalatinsk, Kazakhstan: 1003 49.99102°N 77.63508°E	460 m (1,510 ft) – 48 m (157 ft)	cratering, earth moving		1.1 kt			Cratering explosion for reservoir, test in Sary-Uzen. Cratered 107 m × 31 m (351 ft × 102 ft), and a small chemical charge opened the lip. The crater filled with artesian water.
243	21 November 1965 04:58:00.0	ALMT (6 hrs)	Degelen, Semipalatinsk, Kazakhstan: Zh-2 49.8192°N 78.0636°E	650 m (2,130 ft) +	tunnel, weapons development		29 kt			
244	24 December 1965 05:00:00.2	ALMT (6 hrs)	Degelen, Semipalatinsk, Kazakhstan: Z-3 49.8045°N 78.1067°E	781 m (2,562 ft) +	tunnel, peaceful research		6.7 kt			
