= 1969 Soviet nuclear tests =

1969 Soviet Union nuclear bomb tests

1969
- Nuclear blast animation

Information
- Country: Soviet Union
- Test site: Balapan, Semipalatinsk, Kazakhstan; Degelen, Semipalatinsk, Kazakhstan; Mangystau, Kazakhstan; NZ Area B, Matochkin Shar, Novaya Zemlya, Russia; Perm, Russia; Sary-Uzen/Murzhik, Semipalatinsk, Kazakhstan; Stavropol, Russia
- Period: 1969
- Number of tests: 19
- Test type: underground shaft, tunnel
- Max. yield: 540 kilotonnes of TNT (2,300 TJ)

Test series chronology

The Soviet Union's 1969 nuclear test series was a group of 19 nuclear tests conducted in 1969. These tests (Note: A bomb test may be a salvo test, defined as two or more explosions "where a period of time between successive individual explosions does not exceed 5 seconds and where the burial points of all explosive devices can be connected by segments of straight lines, each of them connecting two burial points and does not exceed 40 kilometers in length". Mikhailov, V. N. "Catalog of World Wide Nuclear Testing". Begell-Atom, LLC. Archived from the original on 2014-04-26.) followed the 1968 Soviet nuclear tests series and preceded the 1970 Soviet nuclear tests series.

Soviet Union's 1969 series tests and detonations
| Name (Note: The US, France and Great Britain have code-named their test events, while the USSR and China did not, and therefore have only test numbers (with some exceptions – Soviet peaceful explosions were named). Word translations into English in parentheses unless the name is a proper noun. A dash followed by a number indicates a member of a salvo event. The US also sometimes named the individual explosions in such a salvo test, which results in "name1 – 1(with name2)". If test is canceled or aborted, then the row data like date and location discloses the intended plans, where known.) | Date time (UT) | Local time zone (Note: To convert the UT time into standard local, add the number of hours in parentheses to the UT time; for local daylight saving time, add one additional hour. If the result is earlier than 00:00, add 24 hours and subtract 1 from the day; if it is 24:00 or later, subtract 24 hours and add 1 to the day. Historical time zone data obtained from the IANA time zone database.) | Location (Note: Rough place name and a latitude/longitude reference; for rocket-carried tests, the launch location is specified before the detonation location, if known. Some locations are extremely accurate; others (like airdrops and space blasts) may be quite inaccurate. "~" indicates a likely pro-forma rough location, shared with other tests in that same area.) | Elevation + height (Note: Elevation is the ground level at the point directly below the explosion relative to sea level; height is the additional distance added or subtracted by tower, balloon, shaft, tunnel, air drop or other contrivance. For rocket bursts the ground level is "N/A". In some cases it is not clear if the height is absolute or relative to ground, for example, Plumbbob/John. No number or units indicates the value is unknown, while "0" means zero. Sorting on this column is by elevation and height added together.) | Delivery, (Note: Atmospheric, airdrop, balloon, gun, cruise missile, rocket, surface, tower, and barge are all disallowed by the Partial Nuclear Test Ban Treaty. Sealed shaft and tunnel are underground, and remained useful under the PTBT. Intentional cratering tests are borderline; they occurred under the treaty, were sometimes protested, and generally overlooked if the test was declared to be a peaceful use.) Purpose (Note: Include weapons development, weapon effects, safety test, transport safety test, war, science, joint verification and industrial/peaceful, which may be further broken down.) | Device (Note: Designations for test items where known, "?" indicates some uncertainty about the preceding value, nicknames for particular devices in quotes. This category of information is often not officially disclosed.) | Yield (Note: Estimated energy yield in tons, kilotons, and megatons. A ton of TNT equivalent is defined as 4.184 gigajoules (1 gigacalorie).) | Fallout (Note: Radioactive emission to the atmosphere aside from prompt neutrons, where known. The measured species is only iodine-131 if mentioned, otherwise it is all species. No entry means unknown, probably none if underground and "all" if not; otherwise notation for whether measured on the site only or off the site, where known, and the measured amount of radioactivity released.) | References | Notes |
|---|---|---|---|---|---|---|---|---|---|---|
| 297 | 7 March 1969 08:26:59.8 | ALMT (6 hrs) | Degelen, Semipalatinsk, Kazakhstan: Zh-2p 49.8215°N 78.0627°E | 650 m (2,130 ft) + | tunnel, weapons development | | 49 kt | | | |
| 298 | 4 April 1969 04:57:00.0 | ALMT (6 hrs) | Degelen, Semipalatinsk, Kazakhstan: 19p 49.75437°N 78.05993°E | 728 m (2,388 ft) + | tunnel, weapons development | | unknown yield | | | |
| 299 | 13 April 1969 | ALMT (6 hrs) | Degelen, Semipalatinsk, Kazakhstan: 24p 49.7362°N 78.1005°E | 673 m (2,208 ft) + | tunnel, peaceful research | | unknown yield | | | |
| 300 | 16 May 1969 04:02:59.7 | ALMT (6 hrs) | Degelen, Semipalatinsk, Kazakhstan: 709 49.7594°N 78.0758°E | 629 m (2,064 ft) + | tunnel, weapons development | | 16 kt | | | |
| 301 | 31 May 1969 05:01:59.4 | ALMT (6 hrs) | Sary-Uzen/Murzhik, Semipalatinsk, Kazakhstan: 108 49.95107°N 77.6865°E | 460 m (1,510 ft) + | underground shaft, weapons development | | 18 kt | | | |
| 302 - 1 | 4 July 1969 02:46:59.6 | ALMT (6 hrs) | Degelen, Semipalatinsk, Kazakhstan: 710 49.746°N 78.1113°E | 599 m (1,965 ft) + | tunnel, peaceful research | | 15 kt | | | |
| 302 - 2 | 4 July 1969 02:46:59.6 | ALMT (6 hrs) | Degelen, Semipalatinsk, Kazakhstan: 710 49.746°N 78.1113°E | 599 m (1,965 ft) + | tunnel, weapons development | | unknown yield | | | |
| 303 | 23 July 1969 02:47:00.2 | ALMT (6 hrs) | Degelen, Semipalatinsk, Kazakhstan: 801 49.8156°N 78.1296°E | 659 m (2,162 ft) + | tunnel, weapons development | | 16 kt | | | |
| 304 Grifon (Griffin) | 2 September 1969 04:59:58.6 | SVET (5 hrs) | Perm, Russia: 1001 57.22°N 55.393°E | – 1,210 m (3,970 ft) | underground shaft, oil stimulation | | 7.6 kt | | | Oil recovery intensification. |
| 305 Grifon (Griffin) | 8 September 1969 04:59:58.7 | SVET (5 hrs) | Perm, Russia: 1002 57.22°N 55.417°E | – 1,210 m (3,970 ft) | underground shaft, oil stimulation | | 7.6 kt | | | Oil recovery intensification. |
| 306 - 1 | 11 September 1969 04:02:00.0 | ALMT (6 hrs) | Degelen, Semipalatinsk, Kazakhstan: 503 49.7763°N 77.9967°E | 682 m (2,238 ft) + | tunnel, peaceful research | | 6.2 kt | | | |
| 306 - 2 | 11 September 1969 04:02:00.0 | ALMT (6 hrs) | Degelen, Semipalatinsk, Kazakhstan: 503 49.7763°N 77.9967°E | 682 m (2,238 ft) + | tunnel, peaceful research | | unknown yield | | | |
| 307 Stavropol | 26 September 1969 06:59:58.1 | MSK (3 hrs) | Stavropol, Russia: ? 45.89°N 42.472°E | – 725 m (2,379 ft) | underground shaft, oil stimulation | | 10 kt | | | Gas extraction intensification. |
| 308 - 1 | 1 October 1969 04:02:59.9 | ALMT (6 hrs) | Degelen, Semipalatinsk, Kazakhstan: 607 49.7825°N 78.0983°E | 634 m (2,080 ft) + | tunnel, weapons development | | 16 kt | | | |
| 308 - 2 | 1 October 1969 04:02:59.9 | ALMT (6 hrs) | Degelen, Semipalatinsk, Kazakhstan: 607 49.7825°N 78.0983°E | 634 m (2,080 ft) + | tunnel, weapons development | | unknown yield | | | |
| 309 - 1 | 14 October 1969 07:00:06.61 | MSK (3 hrs) | NZ Area B, Matochkin Shar, Novaya Zemlya, Russia: A-7 73.39°N 54.787°E | 100 m (330 ft) – 500 m (1,600 ft) | tunnel, weapons development | | 540 kt | Venting detected, more than 1 MCi (37 PBq) | | 80 military personnel witnessing the test were exposed to venting to levels of 40–80 rads. |
| 309 - 2 | 14 October 1969 07:00:06.6 | MSK (3 hrs) | NZ Area B, Matochkin Shar, Novaya Zemlya, Russia: A-7 73.39°N 54.787°E | 100 m (330 ft) + | tunnel, weapons development | | unknown yield | | | |
| 309 - 3 | 14 October 1969 07:00:07 | MSK (3 hrs) | NZ Area B, Matochkin Shar, Novaya Zemlya, Russia: A-9 73.4°N 54.8°E | 100 m (330 ft) – 520 m (1,710 ft) | tunnel, weapons development | | unknown yield | Venting detected off site, more than 1 kCi (37 TBq) | | |
| 310 | 30 October 1969 | ALMT (6 hrs) | Degelen, Semipalatinsk, Kazakhstan: 506p 49.83878°N 78.11945°E | 580 m (1,900 ft) + | tunnel, safety experiment | | unknown yield | | | |
| 311 | 27 November 1969 05:02:00.0 | ALMT (6 hrs) | Degelen, Semipalatinsk, Kazakhstan: 511 49.83077°N 78.06776°E | 600 m (2,000 ft) + | tunnel, peaceful research | | unknown yield | | | |
| 312 | 30 November 1969 03:32:59.7 | ALMT (6 hrs) | Balapan, Semipalatinsk, Kazakhstan: 1054 49.92472°N 78.95522°E | 330 m (1,080 ft) + | underground shaft, weapons development | | 125 kt | | | |
| 313 Say-Utes 2T | 6 December 1969 07:02:59.9 | SHET (5 hrs) | Mangystau, Kazakhstan: 2-T 43.81986°N 54.78317°E | – 410 m (1,350 ft) | underground shaft, earth moving | | 30 kt | | | Alluvial crators created, possibly testing for thermonuke test site. |
| 314 | 28 December 1969 03:47:00.2 | ALMT (6 hrs) | Sary-Uzen/Murzhik, Semipalatinsk, Kazakhstan: 107 49.93742°N 77.71418°E | 460 m (1,510 ft) + | underground shaft, weapons development | | 40 kt | | | |
| 315 | 29 December 1969 04:02:00.0 | ALMT (6 hrs) | Degelen, Semipalatinsk, Kazakhstan: Sh-1 49.7337°N 78.1022°E | 496 m (1,627 ft) + | tunnel, peaceful research | | 10 kt | | | |
