= 1970 Soviet nuclear tests =

1970 Soviet Union nuclear bomb tests

1970
- Nuclear blast animation

Information
- Country: Soviet Union
- Test site: Degelen, Semipalatinsk, Kazakhstan; Mangystau, Kazakhstan; NZ Area B, Matochkin Shar, Novaya Zemlya, Russia; Orenburg, Russia; Sary-Uzen/Murzhik, Semipalatinsk, Kazakhstan
- Period: 1970
- Number of tests: 16
- Test type: underground shaft, tunnel
- Max. yield: 2.2 megatonnes of TNT (9.2 PJ)

Test series chronology

The Soviet Union's 1970 nuclear test series was a group of 16 nuclear tests conducted in 1970. These tests (Note: A bomb test may be a salvo test, defined as two or more explosions "where a period of time between successive individual explosions does not exceed 5 seconds and where the burial points of all explosive devices can be connected by segments of straight lines, each of them connecting two burial points and does not exceed 40 kilometers in length". Mikhailov, V. N. "Catalog of World Wide Nuclear Testing". Begell-Atom, LLC. Archived from the original on 2014-04-26.) followed the 1969 Soviet nuclear tests series and preceded the 1971 Soviet nuclear tests series.

Soviet Union's 1970 series tests and detonations
Name (Note: The US, France and Great Britain have code-named their test events, while the USSR and China did not, and therefore have only test numbers (with some exceptions – Soviet peaceful explosions were named). Word translations into English in parentheses unless the name is a proper noun. A dash followed by a number indicates a member of a salvo event. The US also sometimes named the individual explosions in such a salvo test, which results in "name1 – 1(with name2)". If test is canceled or aborted, then the row data like date and location discloses the intended plans, where known.)	Date time (UT)	Local time zone (Note: To convert the UT time into standard local, add the number of hours in parentheses to the UT time; for local daylight saving time, add one additional hour. If the result is earlier than 00:00, add 24 hours and subtract 1 from the day; if it is 24:00 or later, subtract 24 hours and add 1 to the day. Historical time zone data obtained from the IANA time zone database.)	Location (Note: Rough place name and a latitude/longitude reference; for rocket-carried tests, the launch location is specified before the detonation location, if known. Some locations are extremely accurate; others (like airdrops and space blasts) may be quite inaccurate. "~" indicates a likely pro-forma rough location, shared with other tests in that same area.)	Elevation + height (Note: Elevation is the ground level at the point directly below the explosion relative to sea level; height is the additional distance added or subtracted by tower, balloon, shaft, tunnel, air drop or other contrivance. For rocket bursts the ground level is "N/A". In some cases it is not clear if the height is absolute or relative to ground, for example, Plumbbob/John. No number or units indicates the value is unknown, while "0" means zero. Sorting on this column is by elevation and height added together.)	Delivery, (Note: Atmospheric, airdrop, balloon, gun, cruise missile, rocket, surface, tower, and barge are all disallowed by the Partial Nuclear Test Ban Treaty. Sealed shaft and tunnel are underground, and remained useful under the PTBT. Intentional cratering tests are borderline; they occurred under the treaty, were sometimes protested, and generally overlooked if the test was declared to be a peaceful use.) Purpose (Note: Include weapons development, weapon effects, safety test, transport safety test, war, science, joint verification and industrial/peaceful, which may be further broken down.)	Device (Note: Designations for test items where known, "?" indicates some uncertainty about the preceding value, nicknames for particular devices in quotes. This category of information is often not officially disclosed.)	Yield (Note: Estimated energy yield in tons, kilotons, and megatons. A ton of TNT equivalent is defined as 4.184 gigajoules (1 gigacalorie).)	Fallout (Note: Radioactive emission to the atmosphere aside from prompt neutrons, where known. The measured species is only iodine-131 if mentioned, otherwise it is all species. No entry means unknown, probably none if underground and "all" if not; otherwise notation for whether measured on the site only or off the site, where known, and the measured amount of radioactivity released.)	References	Notes
316 - 1	29 January 1970 07:03:00.0	ALMT (6 hrs)	Degelen, Semipalatinsk, Kazakhstan: 802 49.7956°N 78.1239°E	727 m (2,385 ft) +	tunnel, weapon effect		42 kt			
316 - 2	29 January 1970 07:03:00.0	ALMT (6 hrs)	Degelen, Semipalatinsk, Kazakhstan: 802 49.7956°N 78.1239°E	727 m (2,385 ft) +	tunnel, weapon effect		unknown yield			
316 - 3	29 January 1970 07:03:00.0	ALMT (6 hrs)	Degelen, Semipalatinsk, Kazakhstan: 802 49.7956°N 78.1239°E	727 m (2,385 ft) +	tunnel, weapon effect		unknown yield			
317	18 February 1970	ALMT (6 hrs)	Degelen, Semipalatinsk, Kazakhstan: Sh-2 49.73395°N 78.09982°E	700 m (2,300 ft) +	tunnel, safety experiment		1000 kg			
318	27 March 1970 05:02:59.6	ALMT (6 hrs)	Degelen, Semipalatinsk, Kazakhstan: 610 49.7478°N 77.999°E	698 m (2,290 ft) +	tunnel, peaceful research		6.5 kt			
319	27 May 1970 04:03:00.0	ALMT (6 hrs)	Degelen, Semipalatinsk, Kazakhstan: Sh-3 49.73183°N 78.0975°E	580 m (1,900 ft) +	tunnel, weapons development		900 t			
320 Magistral (Highway)	25 June 1970 04:59:55.5	SVET (5 hrs)	Orenburg, Russia: 1T-2S 52.201°N 55.692°E	– 700 m (2,300 ft)	underground shaft, cavity excavation		2.3 kt			Create reservoirs for gas storage.
321	28 June 1970 01:58:00.0	ALMT (6 hrs)	Degelen, Semipalatinsk, Kazakhstan: 510 49.8015°N 78.1068°E	656 m (2,152 ft) – 332 m (1,089 ft)	tunnel, weapons development		88 kt			
322 - 1	28 June 1970 01:58:??	ALMT (6 hrs)	Degelen, Semipalatinsk, Kazakhstan: 705 49.77677°N 78.04981°E	650 m (2,130 ft) +	tunnel, peaceful research		unknown yield			
322 - 2	28 June 1970 01:58:??	ALMT (6 hrs)	Degelen, Semipalatinsk, Kazakhstan: 705 49.77677°N 78.04981°E	650 m (2,130 ft) +	tunnel, weapons development		unknown yield			
323	21 July 1970 03:02:59.7	ALMT (6 hrs)	Sary-Uzen/Murzhik, Semipalatinsk, Kazakhstan: 104 49.95295°N 77.67238°E	460 m (1,510 ft) +	underground shaft, weapons development		23 kt			
324	24 July 1970 03:57:00.0	ALMT (6 hrs)	Degelen, Semipalatinsk, Kazakhstan: 120 49.8097°N 78.1284°E	732 m (2,402 ft) +	tunnel, weapons development		20 kt			
326	6 September 1970 04:02:59.9	ALMT (6 hrs)	Degelen, Semipalatinsk, Kazakhstan: 8 49.75975°N 78.00533°E	752 m (2,467 ft) +	tunnel, peaceful research		34 kt			
325	6 September 1970 04:03:??	ALMT (6 hrs)	Degelen, Semipalatinsk, Kazakhstan: 502 49.79349°N 78.00537°E	680 m (2,230 ft) +	tunnel, weapons development		unknown yield			
327 - 1	14 October 1970 05:59:57.57	MSK (3 hrs)	NZ Area B, Matochkin Shar, Novaya Zemlya, Russia: A-6 73.304°N 55.027°E	100 m (330 ft) – 1,200 m (3,900 ft)	tunnel, weapons development		2.2 Mt	Venting detected off site, 2 MCi (74 PBq)		
327 - 2	14 October 1970 05:59:57.6	MSK (3 hrs)	NZ Area B, Matochkin Shar, Novaya Zemlya, Russia: A-6 73.304°N 55.027°E	100 m (330 ft) +	tunnel, weapons development		unknown yield			
327 - 3	14 October 1970 05:59:57.6	MSK (3 hrs)	NZ Area B, Matochkin Shar, Novaya Zemlya, Russia: A-6 73.304°N 55.027°E	100 m (330 ft) +	tunnel, weapons development		unknown yield			
328	4 November 1970 06:02:59.8	ALMT (6 hrs)	Sary-Uzen/Murzhik, Semipalatinsk, Kazakhstan: 125 49.98947°N 77.76208°E	460 m (1,510 ft) +	underground shaft, peaceful research		27 kt			Testing of a special explosive for valley cratering, used for the Tiaga event.
329 Say-Utes 6T	12 December 1970 07:00:59.8	SHET (5 hrs)	Mangystau, Kazakhstan: 6T 43.851°N 54.774°E	– 740 m (2,430 ft)	underground shaft, industrial		80 kt			Alluvial cratering, possibly testing for thermonuke test site.
330	17 December 1970 07:01:00.0	ALMT (6 hrs)	Degelen, Semipalatinsk, Kazakhstan: 193 49.7456°N 78.0992°E	624 m (2,047 ft) +	tunnel, weapons development		26 kt			
331 Say-Utes 1T	23 December 1970 07:00:59.8	SHET (5 hrs)	Mangystau, Kazakhstan: 1-T 43.89355°N 54.89875°E	– 500 m (1,600 ft)	underground shaft, industrial		75 kt			Alluvial cratering, possibly testing for thermonuke test site.
