= 1966 Soviet nuclear tests =

1966 Soviet Union nuclear bomb tests

1966
- Nuclear blast animation

Information
- Country: Soviet Union
- Test site: Atyrau, Kazakhstan; Bukhara, Uzbekistan; Degelen, Semipalatinsk, Kazakhstan; NZ Area B, Matochkin Shar, Novaya Zemlya, Russia; Sary-Uzen/Murzhik, Semipalatinsk, Kazakhstan
- Period: 1966
- Number of tests: 18
- Test type: underground shaft, tunnel
- Max. yield: 700 kilotonnes of TNT (2,900 TJ)

Test series chronology

The Soviet Union's 1966 nuclear test series was a group of 18 nuclear tests conducted in 1966. These tests (Note: A bomb test may be a salvo test, defined as two or more explosions "where a period of time between successive individual explosions does not exceed 5 seconds and where the burial points of all explosive devices can be connected by segments of straight lines, each of them connecting two burial points and does not exceed 40 kilometers in length". Mikhailov, V. N. "Catalog of World Wide Nuclear Testing". Begell-Atom, LLC. Archived from the original on 2014-04-26.) followed the 1965 Soviet nuclear tests series and preceded the 1967 Soviet nuclear tests series.

Soviet Union's 1966 series tests and detonations
Name (Note: The US, France and Great Britain have code-named their test events, while the USSR and China did not, and therefore have only test numbers (with some exceptions – Soviet peaceful explosions were named). Word translations into English in parentheses unless the name is a proper noun. A dash followed by a number indicates a member of a salvo event. The US also sometimes named the individual explosions in such a salvo test, which results in "name1 – 1(with name2)". If test is canceled or aborted, then the row data like date and location discloses the intended plans, where known.)	Date time (UT)	Local time zone (Note: To convert the UT time into standard local, add the number of hours in parentheses to the UT time; for local daylight saving time, add one additional hour. If the result is earlier than 00:00, add 24 hours and subtract 1 from the day; if it is 24:00 or later, subtract 24 hours and add 1 to the day. All historical time zone data are derived from here:)	Location (Note: Rough place name and a latitude/longitude reference; for rocket-carried tests, the launch location is specified before the detonation location, if known. Some locations are extremely accurate; others (like airdrops and space blasts) may be quite inaccurate. "~" indicates a likely pro-forma rough location, shared with other tests in that same area.)	Elevation + height (Note: Elevation is the ground level at the point directly below the explosion relative to sea level; height is the additional distance added or subtracted by tower, balloon, shaft, tunnel, air drop or other contrivance. For rocket bursts the ground level is "N/A". In some cases it is not clear if the height is absolute or relative to ground, for example, Plumbbob/John. No number or units indicates the value is unknown, while "0" means zero. Sorting on this column is by elevation and height added together.)	Delivery, (Note: Atmospheric, airdrop, balloon, gun, cruise missile, rocket, surface, tower, and barge are all disallowed by the Partial Nuclear Test Ban Treaty. Sealed shaft and tunnel are underground, and remained useful under the PTBT. Intentional cratering tests are borderline; they occurred under the treaty, were sometimes protested, and generally overlooked if the test was declared to be a peaceful use.) Purpose (Note: Include weapons development, weapon effects, safety test, transport safety test, war, science, joint verification and industrial/peaceful, which may be further broken down.)	Device (Note: Designations for test items where known, "?" indicates some uncertainty about the preceding value, nicknames for particular devices in quotes. This category of information is often not officially disclosed.)	Yield (Note: Estimated energy yield in tons, kilotons, and megatons. A ton of TNT equivalent is defined as 4.184 gigajoules (1 gigacalorie).)	Fallout (Note: Radioactive emission to the atmosphere aside from prompt neutrons, where known. The measured species is only iodine-131 if mentioned, otherwise it is all species. No entry means unknown, probably none if underground and "all" if not; otherwise notation for whether measured on the site only or off the site, where known, and the measured amount of radioactivity released.)	References	Notes
245	13 February 1966 04:58:00.1	ALMT (6 hrs)	Degelen, Semipalatinsk, Kazakhstan: E-1 49.8089°N 78.121°E	730 m (2,400 ft) – 320 m (1,050 ft)	tunnel, peaceful research		125 kt			Highest yield shaft test at Semipalatinsk.
246	20 March 1966 05:50:00.3	ALMT (6 hrs)	Degelen, Semipalatinsk, Kazakhstan: 11 49.7616°N 78.0239°E	765 m (2,510 ft) – 310 m (1,020 ft)	tunnel, weapons development		100 kt			
247	21 April 1966 03:58:00.1	ALMT (6 hrs)	Degelen, Semipalatinsk, Kazakhstan: A-4p 49.8097°N 78.1°E	698 m (2,290 ft) +	tunnel, peaceful research		22 kt			
248 Galit A1 (Halite)	22 April 1966 02:58:00.3	SHET (5 hrs)	Atyrau, Kazakhstan: A-I 47.8297°N 47.93477°E	– 165 m (541 ft)	underground shaft, cavity excavation		1.1 kt	Venting detected		Cavity production in rock salt.
249	7 May 1966 03:58:00.2	ALMT (6 hrs)	Degelen, Semipalatinsk, Kazakhstan: 25 49.7429°N 78.105°E	739 m (2,425 ft) +	tunnel, peaceful research		4 kt			
250	29 June 1966 06:58:00.5	ALMT (6 hrs)	Degelen, Semipalatinsk, Kazakhstan: Z-6 49.8344°N 78.0734°E	600 m (2,000 ft) +	tunnel, peaceful research		42 kt			
251	21 July 1966 03:58:00.0	ALMT (6 hrs)	Degelen, Semipalatinsk, Kazakhstan: 24 49.7367°N 78.097°E	673 m (2,208 ft) +	tunnel, weapons development		24 kt			
252	5 August 1966 03:57:59.6	ALMT (6 hrs)	Degelen, Semipalatinsk, Kazakhstan: 17 49.7643°N 78.0424°E	748 m (2,454 ft) +	tunnel, weapons development		32 kt			
253	19 August 1966 03:52:59.9	ALMT (6 hrs)	Degelen, Semipalatinsk, Kazakhstan: Z-1p 49.8271°N 78.1088°E	630 m (2,070 ft) +	tunnel, peaceful research		10 kt			
254	7 September 1966 03:51:59.7	ALMT (6 hrs)	Degelen, Semipalatinsk, Kazakhstan: Zh-1p 49.8288°N 78.0637°E	630 m (2,070 ft) +	tunnel, fundamental science		4.6 kt			
255 Urta-Bulak	30 September 1966 05:59:51.0	SAMT (5 hrs)	Bukhara, Uzbekistan: 1-s 39.2182°N 64.56684°E	– 1,532 m (5,026 ft)	underground shaft, extinguishing oil/gas fires		30 kt			Gas fire shaft closure.
256	19 October 1966 03:57:59.9	ALMT (6 hrs)	Degelen, Semipalatinsk, Kazakhstan: 13 49.7471°N 78.0205°E	721 m (2,365 ft) +	tunnel, weapons development		55 kt			
258	27 October 1966 05:57:58.1	MSK (3 hrs)	NZ Area B, Matochkin Shar, Novaya Zemlya, Russia: A-2 73.387°N 54.836°E	100 m (330 ft) – 700 m (2,300 ft)	tunnel, weapons development	R-27 (ballistic missile) Warhead	700 kt	Venting detected off site, 10 MCi (370 PBq)		
257	27 October 1966 06:00:??	MSK (3 hrs)	NZ Area B, Matochkin Shar, Novaya Zemlya, Russia: A-1 73.4°N 54.8°E	100 m (330 ft) +	tunnel, weapons development	R-27 (ballistic missile) Warhead	700 kt	Venting detected off site, 10 MCi (370 PBq)		
259	29 October 1966 03:58:00.0	ALMT (6 hrs)	Degelen, Semipalatinsk, Kazakhstan: G 49.78424°N 78.00541°E	705 m (2,313 ft) +	tunnel, weapons development		unknown yield			
260	19 November 1966 03:58:00.0	ALMT (6 hrs)	Degelen, Semipalatinsk, Kazakhstan: Zh-3p 49.82768°N 78.05307°E	625 m (2,051 ft) +	tunnel, weapons development		unknown yield			
261 - 1	3 December 1966 05:02:00.2	ALMT (6 hrs)	Degelen, Semipalatinsk, Kazakhstan: 14 49.7469°N 78.0334°E	665 m (2,182 ft) +	tunnel, weapons development		4.6 kt			
261 - 2	3 December 1966 05:02:00.2	ALMT (6 hrs)	Degelen, Semipalatinsk, Kazakhstan: 14 49.7469°N 78.0334°E	665 m (2,182 ft) +	tunnel, peaceful research		unknown yield			
262	18 December 1966 04:58:00.0	ALMT (6 hrs)	Sary-Uzen/Murzhik, Semipalatinsk, Kazakhstan: 101 49.92515°N 77.74706°E	460 m (1,510 ft) +	underground shaft, peaceful research		100 kt	Venting detected		
