= 1974 Soviet nuclear tests =

1974
- Nuclear blast animation

Information
- Country: Soviet Union
- Test site: Balapan, Semipalatinsk, Kazakhstan; Bashkortostan, Russia; Degelen, Semipalatinsk, Kazakhstan; Komi, Russia; NZ Area A, Chyornaya Guba, Novaya Zemlya, Russia; NZ Area B, Matochkin Shar, Novaya Zemlya, Russia; Sakha, Russia; Sary-Uzen/Murzhik, Semipalatinsk, Kazakhstan; Yamalo-Nenets, Russia
- Period: 1974
- Number of tests: 21
- Test type: underground shaft, tunnel
- Max. yield: 2.3 megatonnes of TNT (9.6 PJ)

Test series chronology

The Soviet Union's 1974 nuclear test series was a group of 21 nuclear tests conducted in 1974. These tests (Note: A bomb test may be a salvo test, defined as two or more explosions "where a period of time between successive individual explosions does not exceed 5 seconds and where the burial points of all explosive devices can be connected by segments of straight lines, each of them connecting two burial points and does not exceed 40 kilometers in length". Mikhailov, V. N. "Catalog of World Wide Nuclear Testing". Begell-Atom, LLC. Archived from the original on 2014-04-26.) followed the 1973 Soviet nuclear tests series and preceded the 1975 Soviet nuclear tests series.

Soviet Union's 1974 series tests and detonations
Name (Note: The US, France and Great Britain have code-named their test events, while the USSR and China did not, and therefore have only test numbers (with some exceptions – Soviet peaceful explosions were named). Word translations into English in parentheses unless the name is a proper noun. A dash followed by a number indicates a member of a salvo event. The US also sometimes named the individual explosions in such a salvo test, which results in "name1 – 1(with name2)". If test is canceled or aborted, then the row data like date and location discloses the intended plans, where known.)	Date time (UT)	Local time zone (Note: To convert the UT time into standard local, add the number of hours in parentheses to the UT time; for local daylight saving time, add one additional hour. If the result is earlier than 00:00, add 24 hours and subtract 1 from the day; if it is 24:00 or later, subtract 24 hours and add 1 to the day. Historical time zone data obtained from the IANA time zone database.)	Location (Note: Rough place name and a latitude/longitude reference; for rocket-carried tests, the launch location is specified before the detonation location, if known. Some locations are extremely accurate; others (like airdrops and space blasts) may be quite inaccurate. "~" indicates a likely pro-forma rough location, shared with other tests in that same area.)	Elevation + height (Note: Elevation is the ground level at the point directly below the explosion relative to sea level; height is the additional distance added or subtracted by tower, balloon, shaft, tunnel, air drop or other contrivance. For rocket bursts the ground level is "N/A". In some cases it is not clear if the height is absolute or relative to ground, for example, Plumbbob/John. No number or units indicates the value is unknown, while "0" means zero. Sorting on this column is by elevation and height added together.)	Delivery, (Note: Atmospheric, airdrop, balloon, gun, cruise missile, rocket, surface, tower, and barge are all disallowed by the Partial Nuclear Test Ban Treaty. Sealed shaft and tunnel are underground, and remained useful under the PTBT. Intentional cratering tests are borderline; they occurred under the treaty, were sometimes protested, and generally overlooked if the test was declared to be a peaceful use.) Purpose (Note: Include weapons development, weapon effects, safety test, transport safety test, war, science, joint verification and industrial/peaceful, which may be further broken down.)	Device (Note: Designations for test items where known, "?" indicates some uncertainty about the preceding value, nicknames for particular devices in quotes. This category of information is often not officially disclosed.)	Yield (Note: Estimated energy yield in tons, kilotons, and megatons. A ton of TNT equivalent is defined as 4.184 gigajoules (1 gigacalorie).)	Fallout (Note: Radioactive emission to the atmosphere aside from prompt neutrons, where known. The measured species is only iodine-131 if mentioned, otherwise it is all species. No entry means unknown, probably none if underground and "all" if not; otherwise notation for whether measured on the site only or off the site, where known, and the measured amount of radioactivity released.)	References	Notes
396 - 1	30 January 1974 04:57:04.6	ALMT (6 hrs)	Degelen, Semipalatinsk, Kazakhstan: 603 49.8158°N 78.0401°E	677 m (2,221 ft) +	tunnel, weapon effect		24 kt			
396 - 2	30 January 1974 04:57:04.6	ALMT (6 hrs)	Degelen, Semipalatinsk, Kazakhstan: 603 49.8158°N 78.0401°E	677 m (2,221 ft) +	tunnel, weapon effect		6 kt			
396 - 3	30 January 1974 04:57:04.6	ALMT (6 hrs)	Degelen, Semipalatinsk, Kazakhstan: 603 49.8158°N 78.0401°E	677 m (2,221 ft) +	tunnel, weapon effect		unknown yield			
397	28 February 1974	ALMT (6 hrs)	Degelen, Semipalatinsk, Kazakhstan: 110 49.8286°N 78.11322°E	618 m (2,028 ft) +	tunnel, safety experiment		1000 kg			
398	16 April 1974 05:52:59.84	ALMT (6 hrs)	Balapan, Semipalatinsk, Kazakhstan: 1301 50.02444°N 78.92639°E	330 m (1,080 ft) +	underground shaft, weapons development		1 kt	Venting detected		
399	16 May 1974 03:03:00.1	ALMT (6 hrs)	Degelen, Semipalatinsk, Kazakhstan: 176 49.7459°N 78.0374°E	652 m (2,139 ft) +	tunnel, weapons development		18 kt			
400	31 May 1974 03:27:00.02	ALMT (6 hrs)	Balapan, Semipalatinsk, Kazakhstan: 1207 49.96148°N 78.84253°E	330 m (1,080 ft) – 316 m (1,037 ft)	underground shaft, peaceful research		71 kt	Venting detected		Up to 127 observers washed with radioactive emissions, some perhaps to 100-200 REM.
401	25 June 1974 03:57:00.2	ALMT (6 hrs)	Degelen, Semipalatinsk, Kazakhstan: Z-1pp 49.82831°N 78.10632°E	630 m (2,070 ft) +	tunnel, weapon effect		3.5 kt			
402 Kama 1	8 July 1974 06:00:00.0	SVET (5 hrs)	Bashkortostan, Russia: Kama-1 53.7°N 55.1°E	– 2,130 m (6,990 ft)	underground shaft, cavity excavation		10 kt			Oil and chemical waste water burial. 22 km W Salavat.
403	10 July 1974 02:57:00.0	ALMT (6 hrs)	Degelen, Semipalatinsk, Kazakhstan: 195 49.7791°N 78.1027°E	600 m (2,000 ft) +	tunnel, weapons development		18 kt			
404	29 July 1974 03:28:00.0	ALMT (6 hrs)	Balapan, Semipalatinsk, Kazakhstan: 1050 49.9375°N 78.93583°E	330 m (1,080 ft) +	underground shaft, weapons development		unknown yield			
405 Gorizont 2 (Horizon)	14 August 1974 15:00:00.2	SVET (5 hrs)	Yamalo-Nenets, Russia: G-2 68.903°N 75.823°E	– 550 m (1,800 ft)	underground shaft, seismic sounding		7.6 kt			Seismic probing program. 190 km NW Tazovsky, Tumen.
407 - 1	29 August 1974 09:59:56.2	MSK (3 hrs)	NZ Area B, Matochkin Shar, Novaya Zemlya, Russia: A-11 73.397°N 54.905°E	100 m (330 ft) – 1,000 m (3,300 ft)	tunnel, weapons development		1.2 Mt	Venting detected off site, 4.9 kCi (180 TBq)		
407 - 2	29 August 1974 09:59:56.2	MSK (3 hrs)	NZ Area B, Matochkin Shar, Novaya Zemlya, Russia: A-11 73.397°N 54.905°E	100 m (330 ft) +	tunnel, weapons development		unknown yield			
407 - 3	29 August 1974 09:59:56.2	MSK (3 hrs)	NZ Area B, Matochkin Shar, Novaya Zemlya, Russia: A-11 73.397°N 54.905°E	100 m (330 ft) +	tunnel, weapons development		unknown yield			
407 - 4	29 August 1974 09:59:56.2	MSK (3 hrs)	NZ Area B, Matochkin Shar, Novaya Zemlya, Russia: A-11 73.397°N 54.905°E	100 m (330 ft) +	tunnel, weapons development		unknown yield			
407 - 5	29 August 1974 09:59:56.2	MSK (3 hrs)	NZ Area B, Matochkin Shar, Novaya Zemlya, Russia: A-11 73.397°N 54.905°E	100 m (330 ft) +	tunnel, weapons development		unknown yield			
406 Gorizont 1 (Horizon)	29 August 1974 15:00:00.4	MSK (3 hrs)	Komi, Russia: G-1 67.08558°N 62.62404°E	– 590 m (1,940 ft)	underground shaft, seismic sounding		7.6 kt			Seismic probing program.
408	13 September 1974 03:03:00.0	ALMT (6 hrs)	Degelen, Semipalatinsk, Kazakhstan: 179 49.7653°N 78.0549°E	690 m (2,260 ft) +	tunnel, weapon effect		14 kt			
409 Kristall (Crystal)	2 October 1974 01:00:01.1	YAKT (9 hrs)	Sakha, Russia 66.45723°N 112.39882°E	305 m (1,001 ft) – 98 m (322 ft)	underground shaft, earth moving		1.7 kt			Designed to build a dam on the Deldyn River; was to be first of 8, but project was scrubbed by high radioactivity. Original crater covered with dirt from mine nearby. 90 km NE Aykhal, Yakutia.
410 Argon 3	16 October 1974 06:33:00.14	ALMT (6 hrs)	Balapan, Semipalatinsk, Kazakhstan: 1005 49.98773°N 78.89438°E	330 m (1,080 ft) +	underground shaft, weapon effect		19 kt			
411	2 November 1974 05:00:00.0	MSK (3 hrs)	NZ Area A, Chyornaya Guba, Novaya Zemlya, Russia: Yu-5N 70.88°N 53.87°E	30 m (98 ft) – 1,500 m (4,900 ft)	underground shaft, weapons development		2.3 Mt			
412	28 November 1974 05:57:00.0	ALMT (6 hrs)	Sary-Uzen/Murzhik, Semipalatinsk, Kazakhstan: 215 49.95°N 77.7°E	460 m (1,510 ft) +	underground shaft, weapons development		10 t	Venting detected		
413 Lazurit (Lazurite)	7 December 1974 05:59:59.0	ALMT (6 hrs)	Sary-Uzen/Murzhik, Semipalatinsk, Kazakhstan: R-1 49.9276°N 77.60523°E	460 m (1,510 ft) – 75 m (246 ft)	underground shaft, earth moving		1.7 kt			Supposed to build a dome, part of a dam wall on the upslope side of a 20 degree slope.
414	16 December 1974 06:23:00.14	ALMT (6 hrs)	Degelen, Semipalatinsk, Kazakhstan: 709p 49.7598°N 78.0754°E	629 m (2,064 ft) +	tunnel, weapons development		6.7 kt			
415	16 December 1974 06:41:00.34	ALMT (6 hrs)	Degelen, Semipalatinsk, Kazakhstan: 148/5 49.8329°N 78.0318°E	600 m (2,000 ft) – 126 m (413 ft)	tunnel, industrial		3.8 kt			A second test of a special device (see #366 and #415) for keeping radioactivity from invading ore bodies when using a bomb to fracture them.
416	27 December 1974 05:46:59.49	ALMT (6 hrs)	Balapan, Semipalatinsk, Kazakhstan: 1058 49.96857°N 79.00437°E	330 m (1,080 ft) +	underground shaft, weapons development		36 kt			
