= 1968 Soviet nuclear tests =

1968 Soviet Union nuclear bomb tests

1968
- Nuclear blast animation

Information
- Country: Soviet Union
- Test site: Atyrau, Kazakhstan; Balapan, Semipalatinsk, Kazakhstan; Degelen, Semipalatinsk, Kazakhstan; Kashkadarya, Uzbekistan; NZ Area B, Matochkin Shar, Novaya Zemlya, Russia; Semipalatinsk Test Site
- Period: 1968
- Number of tests: 17
- Test type: cratering, underground shaft, tunnel
- Max. yield: 165 kilotonnes of TNT (690 TJ)

Test series chronology

The Soviet Union's 1968 nuclear test series was a group of 17 nuclear tests conducted in 1968. These tests (Note: A bomb test may be a salvo test, defined as two or more explosions "where a period of time between successive individual explosions does not exceed 5 seconds and where the burial points of all explosive devices can be connected by segments of straight lines, each of them connecting two burial points and does not exceed 40 kilometers in length". Mikhailov, V. N. "Catalog of World Wide Nuclear Testing". Begell-Atom, LLC. Archived from the original on 2014-04-26.) followed the 1967 Soviet nuclear tests series and preceded the 1969 Soviet nuclear tests series.

Soviet Union's 1968 series tests and detonations
Name (Note: The US, France and Great Britain have code-named their test events, while the USSR and China did not, and therefore have only test numbers (with some exceptions – Soviet peaceful explosions were named). Word translations into English in parentheses unless the name is a proper noun. A dash followed by a number indicates a member of a salvo event. The US also sometimes named the individual explosions in such a salvo test, which results in "name1 – 1(with name2)". If test is canceled or aborted, then the row data like date and location discloses the intended plans, where known.)	Date time (UT)	Local time zone (Note: To convert the UT time into standard local, add the number of hours in parentheses to the UT time; for local daylight saving time, add one additional hour. If the result is earlier than 00:00, add 24 hours and subtract 1 from the day; if it is 24:00 or later, subtract 24 hours and add 1 to the day. Historical time zone data obtained from the IANA time zone database.)	Location (Note: Rough place name and a latitude/longitude reference; for rocket-carried tests, the launch location is specified before the detonation location, if known. Some locations are extremely accurate; others (like airdrops and space blasts) may be quite inaccurate. "~" indicates a likely pro-forma rough location, shared with other tests in that same area.)	Elevation + height (Note: Elevation is the ground level at the point directly below the explosion relative to sea level; height is the additional distance added or subtracted by tower, balloon, shaft, tunnel, air drop or other contrivance. For rocket bursts the ground level is "N/A". In some cases it is not clear if the height is absolute or relative to ground, for example, Plumbbob/John. No number or units indicates the value is unknown, while "0" means zero. Sorting on this column is by elevation and height added together.)	Delivery, (Note: Atmospheric, airdrop, balloon, gun, cruise missile, rocket, surface, tower, and barge are all disallowed by the Partial Nuclear Test Ban Treaty. Sealed shaft and tunnel are underground, and remained useful under the PTBT. Intentional cratering tests are borderline; they occurred under the treaty, were sometimes protested, and generally overlooked if the test was declared to be a peaceful use.) Purpose (Note: Include weapons development, weapon effects, safety test, transport safety test, war, science, joint verification and industrial/peaceful, which may be further broken down.)	Device (Note: Designations for test items where known, "?" indicates some uncertainty about the preceding value, nicknames for particular devices in quotes. This category of information is often not officially disclosed.)	Yield (Note: Estimated energy yield in tons, kilotons, and megatons. A ton of TNT equivalent is defined as 4.184 gigajoules (1 gigacalorie).)	Fallout (Note: Radioactive emission to the atmosphere aside from prompt neutrons, where known. The measured species is only iodine-131 if mentioned, otherwise it is all species. No entry means unknown, probably none if underground and "all" if not; otherwise notation for whether measured on the site only or off the site, where known, and the measured amount of radioactivity released.)	References	Notes
280	7 January 1968 03:46:59.9	ALMT (6 hrs)	Degelen, Semipalatinsk, Kazakhstan: 810 49.7544°N 78.0309°E	698 m (2,290 ft) +	tunnel, peaceful research		7.5 kt	Venting detected		
281	24 April 1968 10:35:59.7	ALMT (6 hrs)	Degelen, Semipalatinsk, Kazakhstan: 505 49.8452°N 78.1032°E	587 m (1,926 ft) +	tunnel, weapons development		6.2 kt			
282 Pamuk	21 May 1968 03:59:12.0	SAMT (5 hrs)	Kashkadarya, Uzbekistan 38.83291°N 65.0871°E	– 2,440 m (8,010 ft)	underground shaft, extinguishing oil/gas fires		47 kt			Used to extinguish active well fire. Note the burnt well just north of location.
283	23 May 1968	ALMT (6 hrs)	Degelen, Semipalatinsk, Kazakhstan: 504 49.83067°N 78.0881°E	617 m (2,024 ft) +	tunnel, weapons development		1000 kg			
284	11 June 1968 03:05:59.7	ALMT (6 hrs)	Degelen, Semipalatinsk, Kazakhstan: 605 49.793°N 78.1451°E	660 m (2,170 ft) +	tunnel, weapons development		15 kt			
285	19 June 1968 05:05:59.8	ALMT (6 hrs)	Balapan, Semipalatinsk, Kazakhstan: 1053 49.9812°N 78.98461°E	330 m (1,080 ft) +	underground shaft, fundamental science		18 kt			
286 Galit A2 (Halite)	1 July 1968 04:02:00.5	SHET (5 hrs)	Atyrau, Kazakhstan: A-II 47.909°N 47.912°E	– 590 m (1,940 ft)	underground shaft, cavity excavation		27 kt			
287 - 1	12 July 1968 12:08:00.0	ALMT (6 hrs)	Degelen, Semipalatinsk, Kazakhstan: 608 49.7547°N 78.0899°E	642 m (2,106 ft) – 172 m (564 ft)	tunnel, weapons development		24 kt			
287 - 2	12 July 1968 12:08:00.0	ALMT (6 hrs)	Degelen, Semipalatinsk, Kazakhstan: 608 49.7547°N 78.0899°E	642 m (2,106 ft) +	tunnel, weapons development		unknown yield			
288 - 1	20 August 1968 04:05:59.6	ALMT (6 hrs)	Degelen, Semipalatinsk, Kazakhstan: A-7 49.8226°N 78.0774°E	705 m (2,313 ft) +	tunnel, weapons development		4.6 kt			
288 - 2	20 August 1968 04:05:59.6	ALMT (6 hrs)	Degelen, Semipalatinsk, Kazakhstan: A-7 49.8226°N 78.0774°E	705 m (2,313 ft) +	tunnel, safety experiment		1000 kg			
289	5 September 1968 04:05:59.6	ALMT (6 hrs)	Degelen, Semipalatinsk, Kazakhstan: 509 49.7416°N 78.0756°E	651 m (2,136 ft) +	tunnel, weapon effect		32 kt			
290	29 September 1968 03:43:00.0	ALMT (6 hrs)	Degelen, Semipalatinsk, Kazakhstan: E-2 49.812°N 78.1219°E	675 m (2,215 ft) +	tunnel, weapon effect		60 kt			
291 Tel'kem 1	21 October 1968 03:52:00.0	ALMT (6 hrs)	Semipalatinsk Test Site: 2308 49.72839°N 78.48542°E	– 31 m (102 ft)	cratering, earth moving		240 t			Prototype canal cratering.
292	29 October 1968 03:54:00.0	ALMT (6 hrs)	Degelen, Semipalatinsk, Kazakhstan: 504p 49.82957°N 78.0906°E	617 m (2,024 ft) +	tunnel, weapons development		unknown yield			
293 - 1	7 November 1968 10:02:05.49	MSK (3 hrs)	NZ Area B, Matochkin Shar, Novaya Zemlya, Russia: A-3 73.387°N 54.858°E	100 m (330 ft) – 1,000 m (3,300 ft)	tunnel, weapons development		1000 kg	Venting detected on site, 10 kCi (370 TBq)		
293 - 2	7 November 1968 10:02:05.5	MSK (3 hrs)	NZ Area B, Matochkin Shar, Novaya Zemlya, Russia: A-3 73.387°N 54.858°E	100 m (330 ft) +	tunnel, weapons development		165 kt			
293 - 3	7 November 1968 10:02:05.5	MSK (3 hrs)	NZ Area B, Matochkin Shar, Novaya Zemlya, Russia: A-3 73.387°N 54.858°E	100 m (330 ft) +	tunnel, weapons development		165 kt			
294	9 November 1968 02:54:00.1	ALMT (6 hrs)	Degelen, Semipalatinsk, Kazakhstan: 606 49.8005°N 78.1391°E	724 m (2,375 ft) +	tunnel, peaceful research		4 kt			
295 Tel'kem 2 - 1	12 November 1968 07:30:00.0	ALMT (6 hrs)	Semipalatinsk Test Site: 2305 49.71322°N 78.46018°E	– 31 m (102 ft)	cratering, earth moving		240 t			Prototype canal linear cratering.
295 Tel'kem 2 - 2	12 November 1968 07:30:00	ALMT (6 hrs)	Semipalatinsk Test Site: 2306 49.71299°N 78.46051°E	+	cratering, earth moving		240 t			Prototype canal linear cratering.
295 Tel'kem 2 - 3	12 November 1968 07:30:00	ALMT (6 hrs)	Semipalatinsk Test Site: 2307 49.71273°N 78.4609°E	+	cratering, earth moving		240 t			Prototype canal linear cratering.
296	18 December 1968 05:01:59.7	ALMT (6 hrs)	Degelen, Semipalatinsk, Kazakhstan: 508 49.7459°N 78.092°E	670 m (2,200 ft) – 194 m (636 ft)	tunnel, peaceful research		8.9 kt			
