= Saryozen (Irtysh basin) =

River in Kazakhstan

Saryozen Сарыөзен
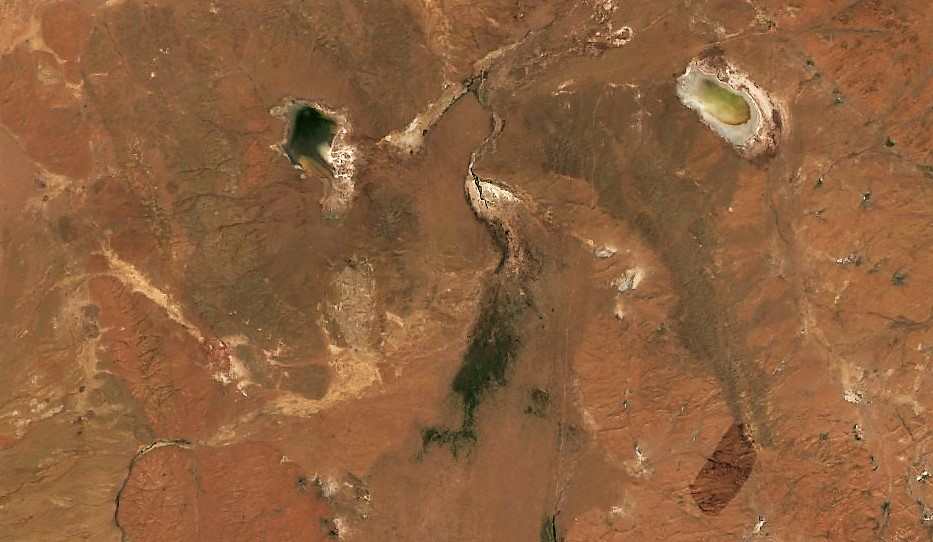
- Final stretch of the Saryozen river

- Mouth location in Kazakhstan

Physical characteristics
- Source: Kazakh Uplands
  - location: Myrzhyk
- Mouth: Akmolaisor (Shalkarsor)
  - coordinates: 50°13′18″N 77°44′03″E
  - elevation: 517 metres (1,696 ft)
- Length: 115 km (71 mi)
- Basin size: 6,056 km^{2} (2,338 sq mi)

The Saryozen (Kazakh: Сарыөзен), also spelled Sary-Uzen (Kazakh: Сары-Өзен; Russian: Сары-Узень), is a river in the Karkaraly District of Karaganda Region and the Zhanasemey District of Abai Region, Kazakhstan. The river is 115 km (71 mi) long and the area of its basin is 6,056 km^{2} (2,338 sq mi).

The water is fresh and is used by locals to irrigate crops and watering livestock. The area surrounding the Saryozen is a seasonal grazing ground for local cattle.

== History ==
The Saryozen valley is located in the Semipalatinsk Test Site complex. A total of 24 underground nuclear explosion tests were performed in wells between 1965 and 1980. The area is contaminated.

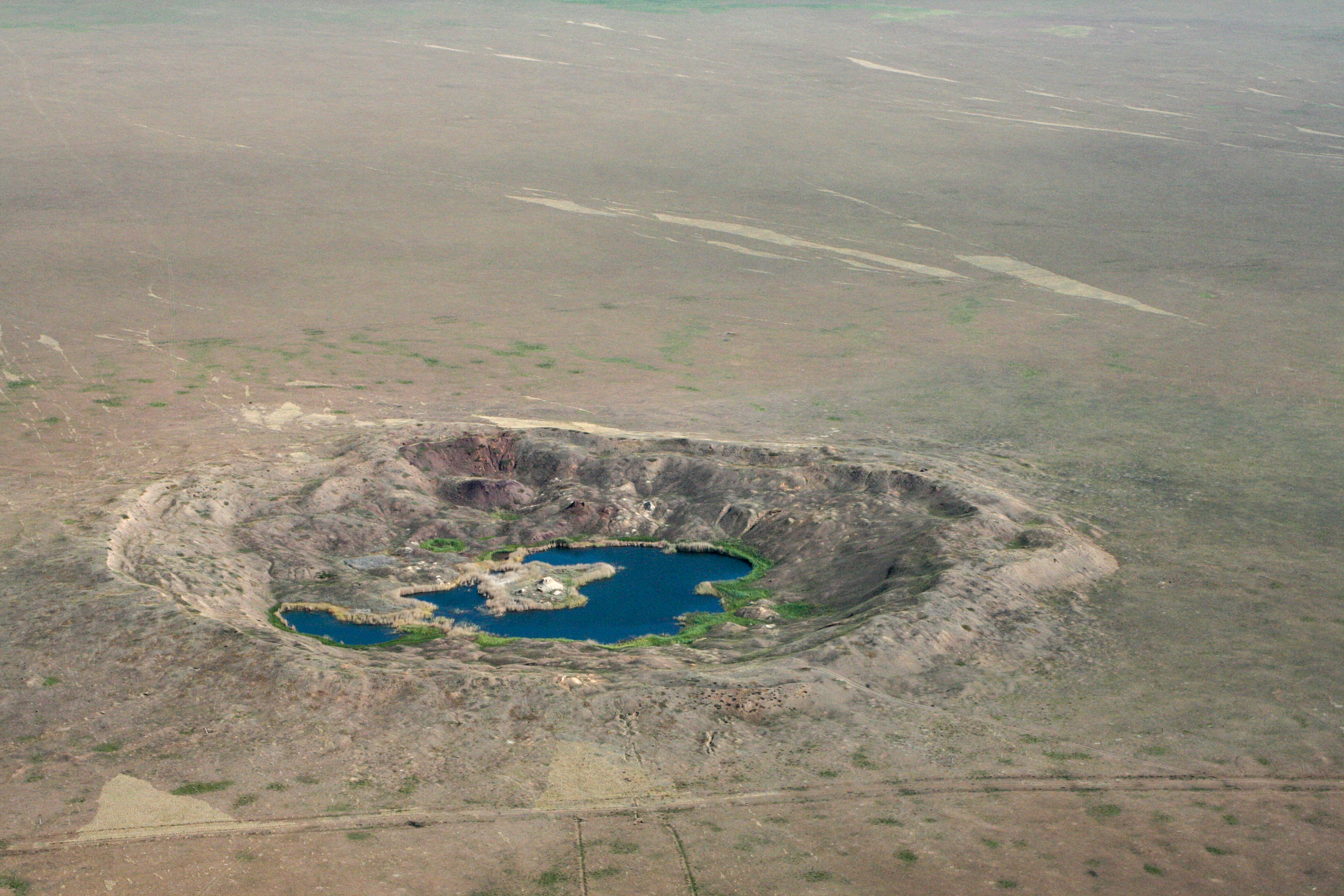
Nuclear test crater in the Saryozen sector of the Semipalatinsk Polygon.

== Geography ==
The Saryozen belongs to the Irtysh basin. It has its sources in parallel rivulets flowing from the southern slopes of the Myrzhyk range and a north-flowing watercourse of Akshok mountain, at the eastern sector of the Kazakh Uplands. The river heads initially eastwards, then it bends northeastwards and in its lower course it bends slightly again and heads roughly northwards. Finally it ends in the Akmolaisor (Shalkarsor), an endorheic salt lake.

The Saryozen flows across a hilly and rugged region of the highland Kazakh steppe. There are many small endorheic lakes along the river course. The river fills in the spring with melted snow and rain, reaching its highest level at the end of April. By the summer it breaks up into disconnected pools.

== See also ==
- List of rivers of Kazakhstan
- Lake Shagan
