= Myrzhyk =

Range of mountains in Kazakhstan

Myrzhyk Range
- Мыржық жотасы
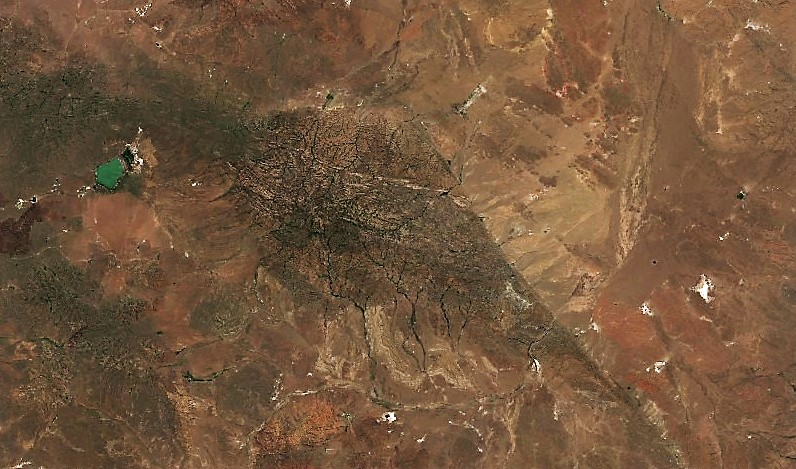
- Myrzhyk Range Sentinel-2 image

Highest point
- Peak: Yegibai
- Elevation: 970 m (3,180 ft)
- Coordinates: 49°57′49″N 77°17′18″E

Dimensions
- Length: 60 km (37 mi) WNW / ESE
- Width: 25 km (16 mi) NNE / SSW

Geography
- Location within Kazakhstan
- Location: Kazakhstan
- Range coordinates: 49°59′N 77°18′E
- Parent range: Kazakh Uplands

Geology
- Orogeny: Alpine orogeny
- Rock age(s): Proterozoic and Ordovician
- Rock type: Metamorphic rock

The Myrzhyk Range (Kazakh: Мыржық жотасы), also spelled Murzhik (Russian: Муржик), is a mountain massif in the Zhanasemey District, Abai Region, Kazakhstan. The northwestern corner of the range is in Karkaraly District, Karaganda Region.

Myrzyk village is located at the feet of the northern slopes of the range, 148 kilometers (92 mi) to the northeast of Karkaraly city. There is an extensive burial ground of the early Bronze Age in the area of the range.

Sary-Uzen/Murzhik is located in the Semipalatinsk Test Site complex. 24 nuclear explosion tests were carried out in it between 1965 and 1980.

== Geography ==
The Myrzhyk Range is part of the Kazakh Upland system (Saryarka). It is a range of moderate altitude located in the northeastern sector of the highlands. Myrzhyk is slightly lower than the massifs in its immediate vicinity, but its size is significantly larger. The Degelen massif lies 40 kilometers (25 mi) to the ESE of the eastern slopes and Mount Ku 40 kilometers (25 mi) to the WSW. A lake named Karasor lies off the west of the northwestern end of the range.

The highest point of the Myrzhyk is 970 meters (3,180 ft) high Yegibai, located in the central area of the range. The higher elevations consist of summits of exposed rock. 115 kilometers (71 mi) long river Saryozen, of the Irtysh basin, has its sources in the range.

== Flora ==
Steppe vegetation is present in the areas where there is soil between the rocks, including sagebrush, sedges and shrubs. There are meadows growing in protected valleys and ravines, as well as clumps of birch, willow, wild rose and juniper.

== See also ==
- Geography of Kazakhstan
