= List of nuclear weapon explosion sites =

This article contains a list of nuclear weapon explosion sites used across the world. It includes nuclear test sites, nuclear combat sites, launch sites for rockets forming part of a nuclear test, and peaceful nuclear test (PNE) sites. There are a few non-nuclear sites included, such as the Degelen Omega chemical blast sites, which are intimately involved with nuclear testing. Listed with each is an approximate location and coordinate link for viewing through GeoHack, and each site is linked to a Wikipedia page on the locality or the nuclear event(s) that occurred there.

Nuclear combat, test, launch and PNE sites
Country	Site location	Site name	Approx. coordinates	Notes
United States				The first nuclear power.
United States	White Sands Missile Range, New Mexico	Trinity Site	33.67717°N 106.47569°W	A bombing range and more lately a missile range centered in the south near Las Cruces, an area in the north part of the range was acquired during World War II and used for the Trinity test. An area near the Trinity site is designated the Permanent High Explosive Test Site (PHETS) and was used in the 1980s to host very large ANFO blasts for international testing of military gear. The Trinity nuclear site was originally private property taken over by the Army to test the plutonium implosion weapon, the first nuclear explosion on Earth.
United States	World War II Combat Zone	Hiroshima, Japan	34.39438°N 132.45547°E	The first target of nuclear weapons, the Mark I atomic bomb. The target was the Aioi Bridge across the Ōta River; it exploded several hundred yards off. Hiroshima was a city of 250,000, suffering 70,000 or so deaths immediately and up to 126,000 by the end of the year.
United States	World War II Combat Zone	Nagasaki, Japan	32.77372°N 129.86325°E	The second target of nuclear weapons, Nagasaki was a city of 240,000 swelled to 263,000 on the day of the strike, chosen when the primary target, Kokura, was found clouded over. About 40,000 died immediately, and officially 73,884 died altogether. 74,909 were injured. Hillier than Hiroshima, the 33% increase in yield from Little Boy resulted in slightly fewer casualties.
United States	Pacific Proving Grounds	Bikini Atoll	11.59084°N 165.50546°E	An atoll in the Marshall Islands, Bikini's lagoon was chosen as the site for the first nuclear test area after WWII. Its use ended with the Partial Nuclear Test Ban Treaty, which forbade atmospheric testing.
United States	Pacific Proving Grounds	Enewetak Atoll	11.55°N 162.31°E	The second atoll used for nuclear testing by the US. Near Bikini Atoll, they served as each other's alternate area.
United States	Pacific Proving Grounds	Pacific Ocean	28.7333°N 126.2667°W	Three US tests were performed in the open ocean away from all islands: Wigwam, Swordfish and Frigate Bird.
United States	Pacific Proving Grounds	Johnston Atoll	16.07239°N 169.60997°W	A small, isolated atoll closest to Hawaii (500 km), Johnston Island served the US testing efforts as an airbase for Operation Dominic and as a rocket base for Operation Hardtack II and Operation Fishbowl.
United States	Pacific Proving Grounds	Kiritimati, Kiribati	1.59°N 157.32°W	Formerly known as Christmas Island (the Pacific one, not the one in the Indian Ocean) Kiritimati was used as an air base for bombers dropping nuclear tests mostly south of the island. It hosted most of the Operation Dominic drops as well as most of Britain's Operation Grapple.
United States	Nevada National Security Site (formerly known as Nevada Test Site, NTS)			A nuclear test site carved out of the Nevada Test and Training Range in Nye County, Nevada in 1952. Roughly the size of Rhode Island, it contains many terrains in which various bombs can be tested.
United States	Nevada National Security Site (formerly known as Nevada Test Site, NTS)	Frenchman Flat, Areas 5, 11	36.8°N 115.929°W	Frenchman Flat was the first area at the NTS used, mostly for drop tests. A small city of structures, a pine forest and multiple cars, trucks and military vehicles were positioned on the salt flat for tests. It is the original "Doom Town".
United States	Nevada National Security Site (formerly known as Nevada Test Site, NTS)	Yucca Flat, Areas 1–4, 6-10	37.08681°N 116.03431°W	The heaviest used test area in the NTS, used early for atmospheric, tower, balloon and crater tests, later for bore-hole tests. The latter are responsible for the large number of subsidence craters for which the area is known.
United States	Nevada National Security Site (formerly known as Nevada Test Site, NTS)	Area 13	37.31935°N 115.90608°W	An area of the NTS which was used for only one zero-yield dispersion test. The area was returned to the Nellis Range, and the subject of considerable cleanup efforts for dispersed plutonium.
United States	Nevada National Security Site (formerly known as Nevada Test Site, NTS)	Rainier Mesa, Area 12	37.20473°N 116.20727°W	The area in which the butte terrain is very amenable for underground horizontal tunnel testing. Contains over a dozen large tunnel complexes and a couple of bore-hole tests.
United States	Nevada National Security Site (formerly known as Nevada Test Site, NTS)	Pahute Mesa, Area 19-20	37.28282°N 116.41319°W	The farthest north of the NTS areas, this area was used mainly for bore-hole testing in hard rock and hard cap rock situations. It hosted at least one hard rock cratering blast.
United States	Nevada National Security Site (formerly known as Nevada Test Site, NTS)	Jackass Flat, Area 26	36.8161°N 116.23936°W	A large area in the NTS southwest. It was not used for nuclear testing, but contains the Yucca Mountain nuclear waste repository, the MX missile mobile test site, the NERVA nuclear rocket test facilities, the BREN Tower, and the X tunnel facility in which depleted uranium weapons were tested. Many of these facilities have been torn down and removed.
United States	Nevada National Security Site (formerly known as Nevada Test Site, NTS)	Dome Mountain, Area 30	37.00773°N 116.37181°W	A mountainous area used for only one Operation Plowshare test, Buggy, in which five bombs in a row were fired in salvo, as a test of trench cutting using nukes.
United States	Nevada National Security Site (formerly known as Nevada Test Site, NTS)	Area 15	37.22626°N 116.06018°W	An area in the NTS in which three tests were executed. It is the site of the EPA's dairy farm which measured cow uptake of fission products, and the old Climax silver mine. Adjacent to the infamous Area 51, on its east edge.
United States	Nevada National Security Site (formerly known as Nevada Test Site, NTS)	Shoshone Mountain, Area 16	37.00959°N 116.20382°W	An area containing a single horizontal tunnel complex used for six separate nuclear tests. It is also the site for the Divine Strake conventional blast experiment, which was aborted by public protests.
United States	Nevada National Security Site (formerly known as Nevada Test Site, NTS)	Tonopah Test Range (aka Area 52)	37.70853°N 116.65786°W	The area owned by the Air Force as the Tonopah Test Range, in which conventional bombs and tactics are evaluated. In 1963, four nuclear dispersion tests in the Roller Coaster series were executed on Tonopah Range land.
United States	South Atlantic Ocean		49.5°S 8.2°W	An area of the South Atlantic Ocean was used in the Argus tests, three rocket launches with small devices to explode in the ionosphere to test electron injection into the magnetosphere as a defensive weapon against enemy ICBM command and control.
United States	Central Nevada		38.63421°N 116.21622°W	A site for the underground testing of large (5 Mt) weapons was sought, since the NTS alluvial valley wasn't suitable, by testing with a 1 Mt "calibration" weapon. The Faultless shot showed central Nevada to be too unstable. The search then turned to Amchitka Island in Alaska.
United States	Amchitka Island		51.41572°N 179.17939°E	Amchitka Island in the Aleutian Islands chain was an alternate site for the underground testing of large nuclear warheads. Used for the Vela Uniform test Long Shot, it was tested for the larger role when Faultless in central Nevada proved that area unsuitable. The Millrow test showed suitability, and the island was used for the 5 Mt Cannikin test, the largest underground test ever performed.
United States	Plowshare Sites	Carlsbad, New Mexico	32.26298°N 103.86592°W	The site of the "Gnome" Plowshare project. It is 13.5 km (8.4 mi) southwest of the Waste Isolation Pilot Plant (WIPP) near Carlsbad.
United States	Plowshare Sites	Farmington, New Mexico	36.6778°N 107.2089°W	A site near Farmington, New Mexico hosted the Gas Buggy shot, an attempt to frac for natural gas.
United States	Plowshare Sites	Parachute, Colorado	39.40535°N 107.94857°W	A site near Rifle, Colorado was used to explode three nuclear devices simultaneously, hoping to create a reservoir in which oil and natural gas could collect. The test was named Rio Blanco.
United States	Plowshare Sites	Rifle, Colorado	39.79322°N 108.3672°W	The Rulison test was an attempt to frac shale and release gas and oil.
United States	Plowshare Sites	Lawrence Livermore National Lab, CA	37.64126°N 121.51317°W	The US's second national nuclear laboratory, LLNL designed weapons and did explosive, sub-critical testing in the hills west of the lab buildings.
United States	Vela Uniform verification sites			A set of tests designed to allow scientists to get calibrated seismic and other data from known shots for the purposes of nuclear testing detection and verification. Later, the verification was to determine that tests could be detected by the Comprehensive Nuclear-Test-Ban Treaty Organization protocols, and in calibrating their equipment.
United States	Vela Uniform verification sites	Salmon Site, Lumberton, Mississippi	31.14229°N 89.57001°W	An underground salt dome site which was used for two separate Vela Uniform project tests.
United States	Vela Uniform verification sites	Rainier Mesa	37.20193°N 116.20986°W	One of the tunnels in the Rainier Mesa complex was used to fire a verification test.
United States	Vela Uniform verification sites	Fallon, Nevada	39.20012°N 118.38124°W	A Vela shot, named Shoal, was fired in a bore hole near Fallon, Nevada.
United States	Vela Uniform verification sites	Balapan	49.94152°N 78.78562°E	The US mission to Kazakhstan set off a series of explosions in unused bore holes for Comprehensive Nuclear Test Ban Treaty calibration.
United States	Vela Uniform verification sites	Degelen (Omega)	49.78291°N 77.96691°E	The US mission to Kazakhstan set off a series of explosions in an unused tunnel for Comprehensive Nuclear Test Ban Treaty calibration, and as test precursors for the eventual destruction of all tunnels in Degelen, known as the Omega series.
United States	Los Alamos, New Mexico	Tech Area 49	35.82289°N 106.30216°W	The US's first national laboratory, Los Alamos was created secretly during World War II to build the first nuclear weapon. During the 1958 moratorium on nuclear testing, a number of sub-critical tests were performed underground to learn more about the dynamics of explosions and the metallurgy of plutonium. The US's first nuclear weapons lab, founded in the Manhattan Project in high secrecy. Tech Area 49 is an open area south of the lab, where zero-yield tests were executed in shallow bore holes during the 1958 moratorium.
Soviet Union				The second nuclear power.
Soviet Union	Semipalatinsk Test Site, Kazakhstan		49.97°N 78.086°E	The first Soviet nuclear test ground, used for all kinds of atmospheric and underground testing, as well as sub-critical tests.
Soviet Union	Semipalatinsk Test Site, Kazakhstan	Ground Zero	50.43794°N 77.81409°E	The first area of the Semipalatinsk Test Site to be used. Tower, ground and air dropped weapons were tested there.
Soviet Union	Semipalatinsk Test Site, Kazakhstan	Sary Uzen/Murzhik	49.95°N 77.7°E	An area used to test a score or so bore-hole emplaced weapons. Some zero-yield testing was done there as well.
Soviet Union	Semipalatinsk Test Site, Kazakhstan	Degelen	49.80325°N 78.06276°E	A mountain massif in the Kazakh plains, Degelen was bored with a hundred or so test tunnels. It was the site for the majority of the zero-yield testing at Semipalatinsk. After being returned to Kazakhstan, the tunnels were closed, then more permanently closed to discourage metal thievery.
Soviet Union	Semipalatinsk Test Site, Kazakhstan	Balapan	49.92944°N 78.8614°E	Balapan was the site of most of the Soviet bore-hole tests. It was also the site of the Chagan massive cratering test, which created Lake Chagan.
Soviet Union	Novaya Zemlya, Arkhangelsk, Russia			The second Soviet nuclear test site, specializing in the very large air dropped tests, including the largest ever, Tsar Bomba.
Soviet Union	Novaya Zemlya, Arkhangelsk, Russia	A: Chyornaya Guba (Black Bay)	70.99°N 53.7°E	The southern end of Novaya Zemlya has been the location for a number of underwater, tower and rocket drop tests of nuclear weapons. Rogachevo Air Base is also located in the area, the launch area for several of nuclear armed missiles targeted north on Sukhoy Nos.
Soviet Union	Novaya Zemlya, Arkhangelsk, Russia	B: Matochin Shar (Matochin Strait)	73.331°N 54.757°E	A mountainous area (on the south side of the north end of the strait which names the test area) is used for horizontal tunnel testing and zero-yield testing. It is still in use for the latter today.
Soviet Union	Novaya Zemlya, Arkhangelsk, Russia	C: Sukhoy Nos (Dry Nose)	73.75°N 54.3°E	The area on the north side of Matochin Strait, used for air and rocket tests of massive blasts. The Tsar Bomba was tested here. The name refers to the land that forms the peninsula on the north side of the west end of the strait.
Soviet Union	Kapustin Yar		48.56956°N 45.90346°E	The first Soviet missile launch and test area. From the original V-2 rocket launch area almost a dozen nuclear armed missiles were launched to explode over Sary Sagan, Central and West Kazakhstan and the Volgograd Oblast (region in Russia).
Soviet Union	Kola Launch Area		70.5°N 39.5°E	A launch area in the Barents Sea between the Kola peninsula and Novaya Zemlya.
Soviet Union	Orenburg, Russia		52.64418°N 52.80547°E	The site of a Soviet Army exercise which included a live nuclear blast.
Soviet Union	Karagandy, Kazakhstan		46.72983°N 71.56304°E	Karagandy had four of the Project K nuclear rockets explode in space above its soil.
Soviet Union	Kyzylorda, Kazakhstan		47.984°N 62.011°E	Kyzylorda was the location over which the 5th Project K rocket propelled bomb exploded. It also hosts the Baikonur Cosmodrome, uninvolved in nuclear testing.
Soviet Union	West Kazakhstan		49.5°N 48°E	West Kazakhstan hosted at least three high altitude detonations, USSR #s 82 and 83, and ZUR-215, all on rockets from Kapustin Yar.
Soviet Union	Komi, Russia		67.46441°N 64.30266°E	This area contains the Vorkuta Sovietski Airbase, from which the two Rosa nuclear rockets were launched toward Sukhoy Nos.
Soviet Union	Volgograd, Russia		48.45°N 44.3°E	The military Grom (Thunder) and Groza (Storm) atomic tests, on rockets from Kapustin Yar, occurred above this area.
Soviet Union	PNE Sites	Arkhangelsk, Russia	65.994°N 41.038°E	This region contains Novaya Zemlya, but besides that it hosts three seismic probe PNEs, Kvartz 1 (Quartz), Rubin 1 (Ruby), and Globus 2 (Globe).
Soviet Union	PNE Sites	Astrakhan, Russia	46.95°N 48.1°E	This region has the Kapustin Yar space center, from which many nuclear armed missiles were tested. 15 tests to create natural gas reservoirs, called the Vega series are in Astrakhan.
Soviet Union	PNE Sites	Bashkortostan, Russia	53.65°N 55.4°E	This autonomous republic contains six PNEs, five named Butan (Butane) and concerned with oil/gas recovery intensification, and two Kama for creating chemical waste storage areas.
Soviet Union	PNE Sites	Irkutsk, Russia	57.251°N 106.551°E	Hosts the seismic probe PNEs Meteorit 4 (Meteorite) and Rift 3.
Soviet Union	PNE Sites	Ivanovo, Russia	57.508°N 42.643°E	Hosts the Globus 1 seismic probe PNE.
Soviet Union	PNE Sites	Kemerovo, Russia	55.834°N 87.526°E	Kemorovo contains a single seismic probe PNE: Kvartz 4 (Quartz).
Soviet Union	PNE Sites	Khanty-Mansi, Russia	61.74616°N 66.77651°E	This district hosts five different PNEs: Kraton 1 (Craton), Kvarts 3 (Quartz) and Kimberlit 1 (Kimberlite), seismic probes; and Angara and Benzol (Benzine), oil intensifications.
Soviet Union	PNE Sites	Komi, Russia	64.16663°N 55.26057°E	This region contains PNEs Globus 3 and 4 (Globe), Kvarts 2 (Quartz), Gorizont (Horizon), all seismic probes.
Soviet Union	PNE Sites	Krasnoyarsk, Russia	69.575°N 90.375°E	The area has seven seismic probe PNEs: Meteorit 2 and 3 (Meteorite), Kimberlit 3 (Kimberlite), Batholit 1 (Batholith), Kraton 2 (Craton), 'Gorizont 3 (Horizon) and Rift 4, and an oil intensification PNE: Schpat 2 (Spar).
Soviet Union	PNE Sites	Kalmykia, Russia	46.853°N 44.938°E	The Republic of Kalmykia hosts the Region 4 seismic probe PNE.
Soviet Union	PNE Sites	Murmansk, Russia	67.79105°N 33.60823°E	Murmansk holds two apatite recovery PNEs: Dnepr 1 and 2.
Soviet Union	PNE Sites	Nenetsky, Russia	67.95265°N 53.96737°E	Holds one seismic probe PNE: Pirit 1 (Pyrite), a failed attempt to close a burning gas well.
Soviet Union	PNE Sites	Orenburg, Russia	51.6°N 54.45°E	Besides the infamous Totskoye nuclear exercise, Orenburg hosts three seismic probe PNEs: Magistral (Highway) and Region 1 and 2, and an oil intensification PNE: Sapfir 1 and 2 (Sapphire).
Soviet Union	PNE Sites	Perm, Russia	60.3°N 57.1°E	Perm hosts three channel digging PNEs: Tiaga 1,2 and 3, and seven oil intensification PNEs: Geligy 1-5 (Helium) and Grifon 1-2 (Griffin).
Soviet Union	PNE Sites	Sakha, Russia	65.925°N 112.338°E	Hosts seismic probe PNEs Kimberlit 4 (Kimberlite), Kraton 3-4 (Craton), an excavation PNE Krystal (Crystal), and oil intensification shots of the Neva series of 5.
Soviet Union	PNE Sites	Stavropol, Russia	45.89°N 42.472°E	Stavropol contains a single PNE named Stavropol, for gas intensification.
Soviet Union	PNE Sites	Tyumen, Russia	57.69°N 65.27°E	Tyumen contains a single PNE Tavda, designed for underground gas storage.
Soviet Union	PNE Sites	Yamalo-Nenets, Russia	68.903°N 75.823°E	Contains the three seismic probe PNEs: Gorizont 2 (Horizon), Rift 1 and Rubin 1 (Ruby).
Soviet Union	PNE Sites	Zabaykalsky, Russia	51.91335°N 113.13053°E	The long range atomic missile test Tyulpan (Tulip) originated from this district, then known as Chita.
Soviet Union	PNE Sites	Aktobe, Kazakhstan	47.6°N 56.2°E	The site of a single seismic sounding PNE named Basolit 2 (Batholith).
Soviet Union	PNE Sites	Atyrau, Kazakhstan	47.909°N 47.912°E	The location for a series of PNEs exploring the use of salt domes for storage of natural gas, name Galit (Halite or rock salt).
Soviet Union	PNE Sites	Karagandy, Kazakhstan	50.52747°N 68.3214°E	Containing part of Semipalatinsk and all of Sary Shagan, Karagandy has a single PNE named Meridian 1, but also had four of the Project K nuclear rockets explode in space above its soil.
Soviet Union	PNE Sites	Kostanay, Kazakhstan	51.84143°N 64.21328°E	Kostanay Province hosted a single PNE called Region 5, one of the seismic probing series.
Soviet Union	PNE Sites	Mangystau, Kazakhstan	43.851°N 54.774°E	Mangystau hosted three shallow PNEs known as Say Utes. Their purpose may have been exploration for a high energy weapons test site.
Soviet Union	PNE Sites	South Kazakhstan	42.775°N 67.408°E	South Kazakhstan hosted a single PNE named Meridian 3, one of the seismic probe shots.
Soviet Union	PNE Sites	West Kazakhstan	51.36273°N 53.30564°E	West Kazakhstan hosted three underground cavity experiments named Lira, and Region 2, a seismic probe. There were also military high altitude tests.
Soviet Union	PNE Sites	Bukhara, Uzbekistan	39.2182°N 64.56684°E	Near Turkmenistan, another gas well fire was extinguished with a nuke named Urta-Bulak.
Soviet Union	PNE Sites	Kashkadarya, Uzbekistan	38.83291°N 65.0871°E	Kashkadarya hosted a single PNE call Pamuk, to successfully extinguish a gas well fire.
Soviet Union	PNE Sites	Donetsk, Ukraine	48.21336°N 38.28162°E	The Donetsk region of Ukraine hosted a single PNE name Klivazh (Cleavage), a shot designed to releieve gas pressure in a coal deposit.
Soviet Union	PNE Sites	Kharkiv, Ukraine	49.47973°N 35.49465°E	Kharkiv hosted a single PNE named Fakel (Torch), an unsuccessful effort to extinguish a burning gas well.
United Kingdom				The third nuclear power.
United Kingdom	Montebello Islands, Western Australia		20.40293°S 115.5689°E	An archipelago of islands on Australia's northwest coast, the area was chosen for three British tests. The first, Hurricane, was in a ship in a waterway; the other two were tower shots on a couple of the islands.
United Kingdom	Emu Field, South Australia	Woomera Prohibited Area	28.7122°S 132.3773°E	The site of a pair of British tower tests named Totem. Test site is no longer part of the Woomera Prohibited Area.
United Kingdom	Maralinga, South Australia	Woomera Prohibited Area	29.8948°S 131.5916°E	The site of a pair of British test series named Buffalo and Antler, as well as a long series of "small" tests: safety tests, zero yield tests and so on. Test site is no longer part of the Woomera Prohibited Area.
United Kingdom	Kiritimati, Kiribati		1.66932°N 157.22742°W	Formerly known as Christmas Island (the Pacific one, not the one in the Indian Ocean) Kiritimati was used as an air base for bombers dropping nuclear tests mostly south of the island It hosted most of the Operation Dominic drops as well as most of Britain's Operation Grapple.
United Kingdom	Malden Island, Kiribati		1.66932°N 157.22742°W	Three of the UK's Operation Grapple series were exploded above this island.
United Kingdom	Nevada Test Site		37.24838°N 116.42311°W	In 1958 the US and the UK concluded the 1958 US–UK Mutual Defence Agreement. Among other things, it gave the UK the right to use the US testing facilities to test their weapon designs. The UK tested 24 weapons underground in the US starting in 1962, ending when the Comprehensive Nuclear Test Ban Treaty closed all testing in 1991.
France				The fourth nuclear power.
France	Reggane (CEMO)		26.3117°N 0.0572°W	A French experimental facility, Centre Saharien d'Expérimentations Militaires (CEMO), was chosen for France's initial bomb tests. The fourth bomb Gerboise Verte had to be scuttled so it would not be confiscated by the Algerian regime in revolt.
France	In Ekker (CSEM)		24.0434°N 5.05672°E	A large mountain massif in Algeria near the village of In Eker was leased from Algeria for French underground testing base under the name Centre d'Expérimentations Militaires des Oasis (CSEM); the nearby smaller rock of Adrar Tikertine was the site of five safety tests named Pollen.
France	French Polynesia	Moruroa Atoll	21.83°S 138.88°W	The primary atoll for French nuclear tests in French Polynesia. Earlier tests were air drops in the area, later bore holes into the coral and volcanic rock underneath were used.
France	French Polynesia	Fangataufa Atoll	22.23°S 138.73°W	The secondary atoll for French tests, used when Muroroa became too contaminated for crew safety.
China				The fifth nuclear power.
China	Lop Nur		The test base for all of China's nuclear tests.	
China	Lop Nur	Area A: Nanshan	41.725°N 88.3588°E	The Nanshan (South Mountain) featured a mountain bluff ideal for horizontal tunneling. Four, and later a fifth, tunnels were bored to accommodate six nuclear tests and a series of sub-critical tests.
China	Lop Nur	Area B: Qinggir	41.375°N 88.326°E	Qinggir is an area of broken, but fairly level ground which was exploited for 13 boreholes used for underground tests.
China	Lop Nur	Area C: Beishan	41.5437°N 88.7641°E	Beishan (North Mountain) was used for tunnels for two tests.
China	Lop Nur	Area D: Drop Area	40.81246°N 89.7901°E	An area of Lop Nur set aside for bomb drops from airplanes, and was the site of 596, the first Chinese (tower) explosion.
China	Jiuquan Satellite Launch Center		41.30782°N 100.31528°E	China's first civil and military space operations base, the nuclear launch was probably from Site 2 or 3, now inactive.
India				The sixth nuclear power.
India	Pokhran		27.09451°N 71.75365°E	An area in India's western desert. The first test was in an open area, the rest in a containment several miles southwest.
Pakistan				The seventh nuclear power.
Pakistan	Kirana Hills		31.95743°N 72.69235°E	A series of low hills in a populated area in Pakistan, in which the Army dug tunnels in which to perform "cold" (zero-yield) tests in preparation for building their nuclear weapon.
Pakistan	Ras Koh		28.79273°N 64.94565°E	The test site for the first Pakistani weapon, a horizontal tunnel dug under a mountain massif. The trademark pictures of the test are of the mountain shaking off a layer of dust and avalanching rock from the internal impact.
Pakistan	Kharan Desert		28.35828°N 63.85882°E	The site for the balance of the Pakistani nuclear testing, a single test which may have had from 1 to 6 weapons included, all fired simultaneously.
North Korea				The eighth nuclear power.
North Korea	Punggye-ri Test Site		41.28505°N 129.1084°E	A test area for tunnel tests in northeastern North Korea. It sported several horizontal tunnels under the surrounding mountains but eventually testing settled on a single area under a mountain to the north of the base. The 2017 test weakened the mountain support and caused a cave-in, resulting in a reported 200 worker deaths. Punggye-ri was formally closed in May 2018, and destruction of the facilities and the tunnels was witnessed.
South Africa				South Africa was embarked on creating nuclear weapons when the apartheid government decided to cancel the program short of the first test.
South Africa	Vastrap Field		27.83348°S 21.62735°E	The intended site for South Africa's first nuclear tests. The site was prepared for use, and then abandoned when the apartheid government decided to give up nuclear weapons.
Brazil				Brazil's program for creating nuclear weapons was canceled in 1990, five years after the military regime that started it.
Brazil	Campo de Provas Brigadeiro Velloso		9.28045°S 54.95331°W	Brazil had a semi-clandestine weapons program called the "Parallel Program" until 1990 when President Fernando Collor de Mello canceled it, and this was to be the test site.

== See also ==
- List of nuclear and radiation accidents and incidents
- List of nuclear weapons tests
- Worldwide nuclear testing counts and summary
