= Degelen =

Range of mountains in Kazakhstan

- Дегелең
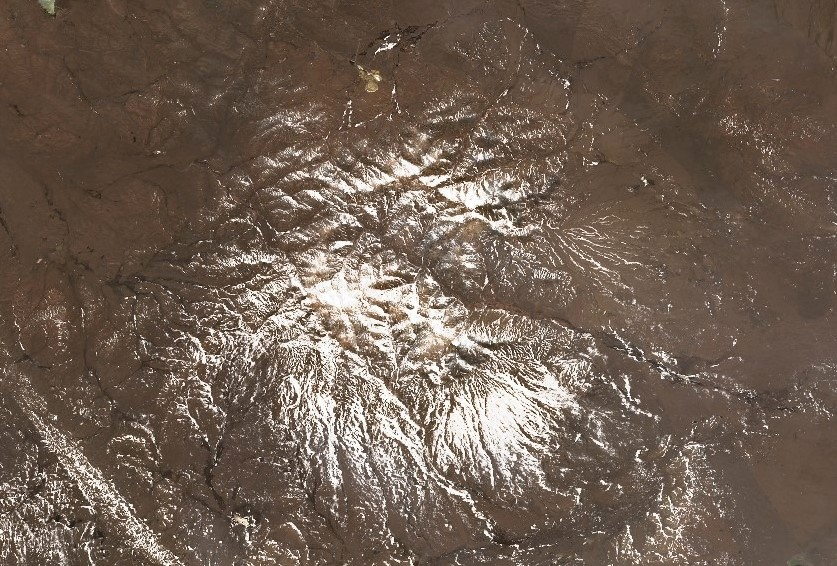
- Degelen massif Sentinel-2 image

Highest point
- Elevation: 1,084 m (3,556 ft)

Dimensions
- Length: 20 km (12 mi) NW / SE
- Width: 15 km (9.3 mi) NE / SW

Geography
- Location within Kazakhstan
- Location: Kazakhstan
- Range coordinates: 49°47′N 78°04′E
- Parent range: Kazakh Uplands

Geology
- Orogeny: Alpine orogeny
- Rock age: Devonian

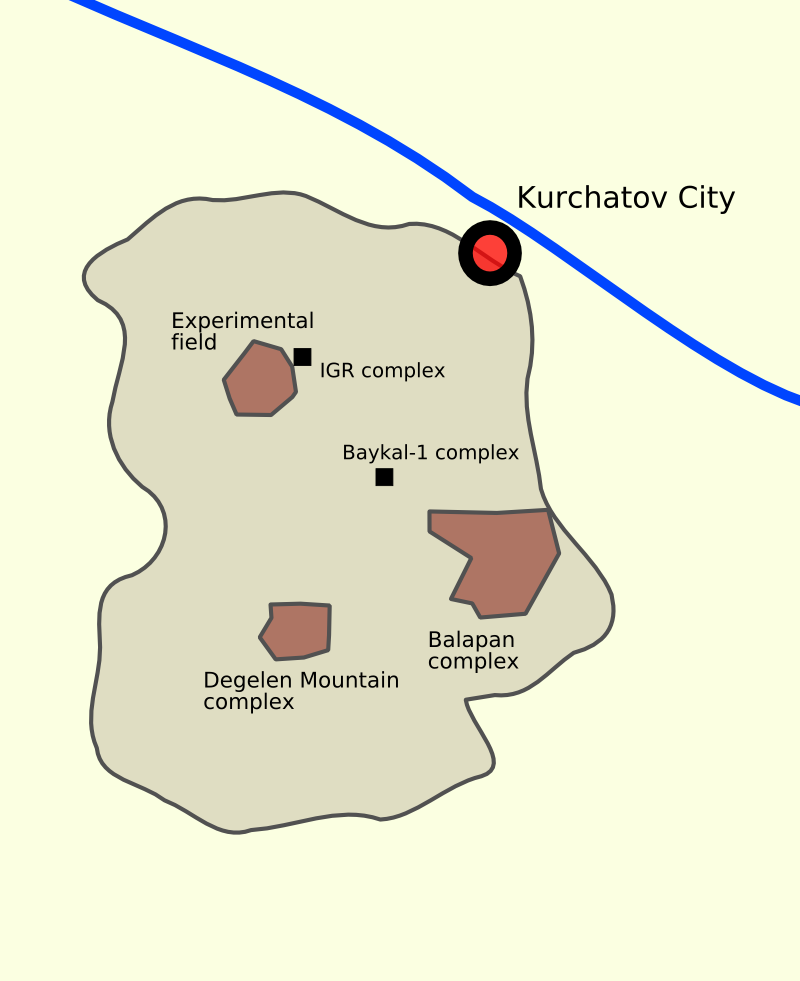
Location of Degelen within the Semipalatinsk Polygon.

Degelen (Kazakh: Дегелең) is a mountain massif in the Zhanasemey District, Abai Region, Kazakhstan.

Semey city, former Semipalatinsk, lies about 200 kilometers (120 mi) to the ENE of the Degelen mountain area. The Balapan nuclear test site lies to the northeast.

== History ==
At the time of the Kazakh SSR Degelen was part of the Semipalatinsk Test Site complex. Around hundred horizontal tunnels were bored into the mountain to carry out nuclear tests operated by the USSR armed forces. The mountain massif was the location chosen for the majority of the subcritical and supercritical tests. 215 underground nuclear explosions were carried out.

In 1991, following the dissolution of the Soviet Union, the site was taken over by the government of Kazakhstan. The tunnels were closed in 1993. The abandoned electrical installations and the rails that had been used to transport the nuclear devices deep into the earth became a target of scavengers. Pillaging of copper and iron went on despite the safety measures at the site. Some of the tunnels were stocked with undetonated plutonium and they had to be sealed more thoroughly as part of a plan to eliminate nuclear weapons testing infrastructure in the mountain range.

== Geography ==
Degelen is part of the Kazakh Upland system (Saryarka). It is a compact-shaped range of moderate altitude located in the northeastern sector of the highlands. The abandoned village named Degelen after the massif lies off the northwestern slopes and the Myrzhyk massif lies 30 kilometers (19 mi) to the WNW.

Several peaks in the Degelen exceed 1,000 meters (3,300 ft); the highest point is a 1,084 meters (3,556 ft) high summit. There are many fresh water springs in the mountains and the slopes are cut by ravines. A deep valley that opens to the east runs across the middle of the range dividing it into two segments: Ulken Degelen, the northern one, stretches from northwest to the southeast for 15 kilometers (9.3 mi). Kishi Degelen, the southern one, is 5 kilometers (3.1 mi) wide and is almost as large. The Kalybai pass is at the western end of the valley. North flowing river Karabulak and east flowing Uzynbulak have their sources in the Degelen.

== Flora ==
The slopes of the massif are covered with steppe vegetation, including sedges, sagebrush and fescue. The narrow valleys have dense bush growth and birch, aspen-birch, and poplar-aspen forest. The soil and water of the area are still under radioactive contamination. In order to assess recovery, experimental zones have been planted with poplar, silver birch, Tatar maple and elm seedlings.

== See also ==
- 1989 Soviet nuclear tests
- List of nuclear test sites
