= 1984 Soviet nuclear tests =

1984

Information
- Country: Soviet Union
- Test site: Astrakhan, Russia; Balapan, Semipalatinsk, Kazakhstan; Degelen, Semipalatinsk, Kazakhstan; Kemerovo, Russia; Khanty-Mansi, Russia; Komi, Russia; Murmansk, Russia; NZ Area B, Matochkin Shar, Novaya Zemlya, Russia; Perm, Russia; Western Kazakhstan
- Period: 1984
- Number of tests: 29
- Test type: underground shaft, tunnel
- Max. yield: 150 kilotonnes of TNT (630 TJ)

Test series chronology

The Soviet Union's 1984 nuclear test series was a group of 29 nuclear tests conducted in 1984. These tests (Note: A bomb test may be a salvo test, defined as two or more explosions "where a period of time between successive individual explosions does not exceed 5 seconds and where the burial points of all explosive devices can be connected by segments of straight lines, each of them connecting two burial points and does not exceed 40 kilometers in length". Mikhailov, V. N. "Catalog of World Wide Nuclear Testing". Begell-Atom, LLC. Archived from the original on 2014-04-26.) followed the 1983 Soviet nuclear tests series and preceded the 1985 Soviet nuclear tests series.

Soviet Union's 1984 series tests and detonations
Name (Note: The US, France and Great Britain have code-named their test events, while the USSR and China did not, and therefore have only test numbers (with some exceptions – Soviet peaceful explosions were named). Word translations into English in parentheses unless the name is a proper noun. A dash followed by a number indicates a member of a salvo event. The US also sometimes named the individual explosions in such a salvo test, which results in "name1 – 1(with name2)". If test is canceled or aborted, then the row data like date and location discloses the intended plans, where known.)	Date time (UT)	Local time zone (Note: To convert the UT time into standard local, add the number of hours in parentheses to the UT time; for local daylight saving time, add one additional hour. If the result is earlier than 00:00, add 24 hours and subtract 1 from the day; if it is 24:00 or later, subtract 24 hours and add 1 to the day. v)	Location (Note: Rough place name and a latitude/longitude reference; for rocket-carried tests, the launch location is specified before the detonation location, if known. Some locations are extremely accurate; others (like airdrops and space blasts) may be quite inaccurate. "~" indicates a likely pro-forma rough location, shared with other tests in that same area.)	Elevation + height (Note: Elevation is the ground level at the point directly below the explosion relative to sea level; height is the additional distance added or subtracted by tower, balloon, shaft, tunnel, air drop or other contrivance. For rocket bursts the ground level is "N/A". In some cases it is not clear if the height is absolute or relative to ground, for example, Plumbbob/John. No number or units indicates the value is unknown, while "0" means zero. Sorting on this column is by elevation and height added together.)	Delivery, (Note: Atmospheric, airdrop, balloon, gun, cruise missile, rocket, surface, tower, and barge are all disallowed by the Partial Nuclear Test Ban Treaty. Sealed shaft and tunnel are underground, and remained useful under the PTBT. Intentional cratering tests are borderline; they occurred under the treaty, were sometimes protested, and generally overlooked if the test was declared to be a peaceful use.) Purpose (Note: Include weapons development, weapon effects, safety test, transport safety test, war, science, joint verification and industrial/peaceful, which may be further broken down.)	Device (Note: Designations for test items where known, "?" indicates some uncertainty about the preceding value, nicknames for particular devices in quotes. This category of information is often not officially disclosed.)	Yield (Note: Estimated energy yield in tons, kilotons, and megatons. A ton of TNT equivalent is defined as 4.184 gigajoules (1 gigacalorie).)	Fallout (Note: Radioactive emission to the atmosphere aside from prompt neutrons, where known. The measured species is only iodine-131 if mentioned, otherwise it is all species. No entry means unknown, probably none if underground and "all" if not; otherwise notation for whether measured on the site only or off the site, where known, and the measured amount of radioactivity released.)	References	Notes
632	19 February 1984 03:57:05.92	ALMT (6 hrs)	Balapan, Semipalatinsk, Kazakhstan: 1331 49.90038°N 78.74324°E	330 m (1,080 ft) +	underground shaft, weapons development		49 kt			
633	7 March 1984 02:39:08.86	ALMT (6 hrs)	Balapan, Semipalatinsk, Kazakhstan: 1308 50.05543°N 78.95372°E	330 m (1,080 ft) +	underground shaft, weapons development		42 kt			
634	29 March 1984 05:19:10.75	ALMT (6 hrs)	Balapan, Semipalatinsk, Kazakhstan: 1335 49.91185°N 78.92689°E	330 m (1,080 ft) +	underground shaft, weapons development		83 kt			
635 - 1	15 April 1984 03:17:11.46	ALMT (6 hrs)	Degelen, Semipalatinsk, Kazakhstan: 190 49.7499°N 78.0824°E	650 m (2,130 ft) +	tunnel, weapons development		60 kt			
635 - 2	15 April 1984 03:17:11.5	ALMT (6 hrs)	Degelen, Semipalatinsk, Kazakhstan: 190 49.7499°N 78.0824°E	650 m (2,130 ft) +	tunnel, weapons development		unknown yield			
636 - 1	25 April 1984 01:09:06.09	ALMT (6 hrs)	Balapan, Semipalatinsk, Kazakhstan: 1316 49.93727°N 78.8506°E	330 m (1,080 ft) +	underground shaft, weapons development		76 kt			
636 - 2	25 April 1984 01:09:06.1	ALMT (6 hrs)	Balapan, Semipalatinsk, Kazakhstan: 1316 49.93727°N 78.8506°E	330 m (1,080 ft) +	underground shaft, weapons development		unknown yield			
637 - 1	26 May 1984 03:13:14.92	ALMT (6 hrs)	Balapan, Semipalatinsk, Kazakhstan: 1414 49.98011°N 79.00611°E	330 m (1,080 ft) +	underground shaft, weapons development		130 kt			
637 - 2	26 May 1984 03:13:14.9	ALMT (6 hrs)	Balapan, Semipalatinsk, Kazakhstan: 1414 49.98011°N 79.00611°E	330 m (1,080 ft) +	underground shaft, weapons development		unknown yield			
unnumbered #9	7 June 1984	ALMT (6 hrs)	Degelen, Semipalatinsk, Kazakhstan: 129p 49.79°N 78.109°E	+	tunnel,		less than 0.001 kt			
638 - 1	14 July 1984 01:09:13.08	ALMT (6 hrs)	Balapan, Semipalatinsk, Kazakhstan: 1344 49.90944°N 78.87722°E	330 m (1,080 ft) +	underground shaft, weapons development		135 kt			
638 - 2	14 July 1984 01:09:13.1	ALMT (6 hrs)	Balapan, Semipalatinsk, Kazakhstan: 1344 49.90944°N 78.87722°E	330 m (1,080 ft) +	underground shaft, weapons development		unknown yield			
639 Lira 4T (Lyra)	21 July 1984 02:59:59.8	URAT1 (6 hrs)	Western Kazakhstan: 4T 51.35832°N 53.31979°E	72 m (236 ft) – 850 m (2,790 ft)	underground shaft, cavity excavation		15 kt			Create reservoirs for gas storage.
640 Lira 6T (Lyra)	21 July 1984 03:04:59.7	URAT1 (6 hrs)	Western Kazakhstan: 6T 51.37168°N 53.33548°E	71 m (233 ft) – 960 m (3,150 ft)	underground shaft, cavity excavation		15 kt			Create reservoirs for gas storage.
641 Lira 5T (Lyra)	21 July 1984 03:09:59.9	URAT1 (6 hrs)	Western Kazakhstan: 5T 51.39165°N 53.34965°E	66 m (217 ft) – 840 m (2,760 ft)	underground shaft, cavity excavation		15 kt			Create reservoirs for gas storage.
642 Kvarts 2 (Quartz)	11 August 1984 19:00:00.2	MSK (3 hrs)	Komi, Russia: K-2 65.05°N 55.1°E	– 760 m (2,490 ft)	underground shaft, seismic sounding		85 kt			Seismic probing program.
643 Kvarts 3 (Quartz)	25 August 1984 19:00:00.3	SVET (5 hrs)	Khanty-Mansi, Russia: K-3 61.9°N 72.1°E	– 725 m (2,379 ft)	underground shaft, seismic sounding		8.5 kt			Seismic probing program.
644 Dynamika (Dynamic)	26 August 1984 03:30:??	MSK (3 hrs)	NZ Area B, Matochkin Shar, Novaya Zemlya, Russia: A-100 73.4°N 54.8°E	100 m (330 ft) +	tunnel, weapon effect		600 t			
645 Dnepr 2 - 1	27 August 1984 06:00:00.1	MSK (3 hrs)	Murmansk, Russia: Dnepr-2 67.82037°N 33.63255°E	– 180 m (590 ft)	tunnel, industrial		1.7 kt			Ore crushing technology.
645 Dnepr 2 - 2	27 August 1984 06:00:00	MSK (3 hrs)	Murmansk, Russia: Dnepr-2 67.82037°N 33.63255°E	– 160 m (520 ft)	tunnel, industrial		1.7 kt			Ore crushing technology.
646 Geliy 2 (Helium)	28 August 1984 02:59:59.8	SVET (5 hrs)	Perm, Russia: 402 60.3°N 57.1°E	– 2,065 m (6,775 ft)	underground shaft, oil stimulation		3.2 kt			Oil recovery intensification.
647 Geliy 2 (Helium)	28 August 1984 03:04:59.9	SVET (5 hrs)	Perm, Russia: 403 60.69531°N 57.50109°E	– 2,075 m (6,808 ft)	underground shaft, oil stimulation		3.2 kt			Oil recovery intensification.
648 - 1	9 September 1984 02:59:08.85	ALMT (6 hrs)	Degelen, Semipalatinsk, Kazakhstan: 132 49.806°N 78.0997°E	719 m (2,359 ft) +	tunnel, weapon effect		6 kt			
648 - 2	9 September 1984 02:59:08.9	ALMT (6 hrs)	Degelen, Semipalatinsk, Kazakhstan: 132 49.806°N 78.0997°E	719 m (2,359 ft) +	tunnel, weapon effect		unknown yield			
648 - 3	9 September 1984 02:59:08.9	ALMT (6 hrs)	Degelen, Semipalatinsk, Kazakhstan: 132 49.806°N 78.0997°E	719 m (2,359 ft) +	tunnel, weapon effect		unknown yield			
648 - 4	9 September 1984 02:59:08.9	ALMT (6 hrs)	Degelen, Semipalatinsk, Kazakhstan: 132 49.806°N 78.0997°E	719 m (2,359 ft) +	tunnel, weapon effect		unknown yield			
649 Kvartz 4 (Quartz)	17 September 1984 21:00:00.0	KRAT (7 hrs)	Kemerovo, Russia: K-4 55.834°N 87.526°E	271 m (889 ft) – 560 m (1,840 ft)	underground shaft, seismic sounding		10 kt			Seismic probing program.
650	18 October 1984 04:57:08.32	ALMT (6 hrs)	Degelen, Semipalatinsk, Kazakhstan: 200M-bis 49.7328°N 78.0987°E	630 m (2,070 ft) – 106 m (348 ft)	tunnel, weapon effect		1.4 kt			
unnumbered #10	25 October 1984	ALMT (6 hrs)	Degelen, Semipalatinsk, Kazakhstan: 129-2p 49.79°N 78.109°E	+	tunnel,		less than 0.001 kt			
651 - 1	25 October 1984 06:29:58.12	MSK (3 hrs)	NZ Area B, Matochkin Shar, Novaya Zemlya, Russia: A-26 73.355°N 54.99°E	100 m (330 ft) – 500 m (1,600 ft)	tunnel, weapons development		110 kt	Venting detected off site, 1.1 MCi (41 PBq)		
651 - 2	25 October 1984 06:29:58.1	MSK (3 hrs)	NZ Area B, Matochkin Shar, Novaya Zemlya, Russia: A-26 73.355°N 54.99°E	100 m (330 ft) +	tunnel, weapons development		unknown yield			
651 - 3	25 October 1984 06:29:58.1	MSK (3 hrs)	NZ Area B, Matochkin Shar, Novaya Zemlya, Russia: A-26 73.355°N 54.99°E	100 m (330 ft) +	tunnel, weapons development		unknown yield			
651 - 4	25 October 1984 06:29:58.1	MSK (3 hrs)	NZ Area B, Matochkin Shar, Novaya Zemlya, Russia: A-26 73.355°N 54.99°E	100 m (330 ft) +	tunnel, weapons development		unknown yield			
654	27 October 1984 01:50:12.9	ALMT (6 hrs)	Balapan, Semipalatinsk, Kazakhstan: 1323 49.93693°N 78.9346°E	330 m (1,080 ft) +	underground shaft, weapons development		150 kt			
652 Vega 14	27 October 1984 06:00:00.1	VOLT (4 hrs)	Astrakhan, Russia: 14RT 46.9°N 48.15°E	10 m (33 ft) – 850 m (2,790 ft)	underground shaft, cavity excavation		3.2 kt			Create reservoirs for gas storage. 35 km N Astrakhan.
653 Vega 15	27 October 1984 06:05:00.0	VOLT (4 hrs)	Astrakhan, Russia: 15RT 46.95°N 48.1°E	10 m (33 ft) – 950 m (3,120 ft)	underground shaft, cavity excavation		3.2 kt			Create reservoirs for gas storage. 35 km N Astrakhan.
655 - 1	23 November 1984 03:55:07.48	ALMT (6 hrs)	Degelen, Semipalatinsk, Kazakhstan: 803-bis 49.8176°N 78.0551°E	732 m (2,402 ft) +	tunnel, weapons development		1.4 kt			
655 - 2	23 November 1984 03:55:07.5	ALMT (6 hrs)	Degelen, Semipalatinsk, Kazakhstan: 803-bis 49.8176°N 78.0551°E	732 m (2,402 ft) +	tunnel, weapons development		unknown yield			
655 - 3	23 November 1984 03:55:07.5	ALMT (6 hrs)	Degelen, Semipalatinsk, Kazakhstan: 803-bis 49.8176°N 78.0551°E	732 m (2,402 ft) +	tunnel, weapons development		unknown yield			
656 - 1	2 December 1984 03:19:08.94	ALMT (6 hrs)	Balapan, Semipalatinsk, Kazakhstan: 1411 50.00967°N 79.00793°E	330 m (1,080 ft) +	underground shaft, weapons development		79 kt			
656 - 2	2 December 1984 03:19:08.9	ALMT (6 hrs)	Balapan, Semipalatinsk, Kazakhstan: 1411 50.00967°N 79.00793°E	330 m (1,080 ft) +	underground shaft, fundamental science		unknown yield			
657 - 1	16 December 1984 03:55:05.19	ALMT (6 hrs)	Balapan, Semipalatinsk, Kazakhstan: 1313 49.94708°N 78.80683°E	330 m (1,080 ft) +	underground shaft, weapons development		137 kt			
657 - 2	16 December 1984 03:55:05.2	ALMT (6 hrs)	Balapan, Semipalatinsk, Kazakhstan: 1313 49.94708°N 78.80683°E	330 m (1,080 ft) +	underground shaft, weapons development		unknown yield			
658 - 1	28 December 1984 03:50:13.15	ALMT (6 hrs)	Balapan, Semipalatinsk, Kazakhstan: 1353 49.87984°N 78.7027°E	330 m (1,080 ft) +	underground shaft, weapons development		105 kt			
658 - 2	28 December 1984 03:50:13.2	ALMT (6 hrs)	Balapan, Semipalatinsk, Kazakhstan: 1353 49.87984°N 78.7027°E	330 m (1,080 ft) +	underground shaft, peaceful research		unknown yield			
