= 1982 Soviet nuclear tests =

1982

Information
- Country: Soviet Union
- Test site: Astrakhan, Russia; Balapan, Semipalatinsk, Kazakhstan; Degelen, Semipalatinsk, Kazakhstan; Irkutsk, Russia; Krasnoyarsk, Russia; NZ Area B, Matochkin Shar, Novaya Zemlya, Russia; Sakha, Russia; Yamalo-Nenets, Russia
- Period: 1982
- Number of tests: 20
- Test type: underground shaft, tunnel
- Max. yield: 145 kilotonnes of TNT (610 TJ)

Test series chronology

The Soviet Union's 1982 nuclear test series was a group of 20 nuclear tests conducted in 1982. These tests (Note: A bomb test may be a salvo test, defined as two or more explosions "where a period of time between successive individual explosions does not exceed 5 seconds and where the burial points of all explosive devices can be connected by segments of straight lines, each of them connecting two burial points and does not exceed 40 kilometers in length". Mikhailov, V. N. "Catalog of World Wide Nuclear Testing". Begell-Atom, LLC. Archived from the original on 2014-04-26.) followed the 1981 Soviet nuclear tests series and preceded the 1983 Soviet nuclear tests series.

Soviet Union's 1982 series tests and detonations
Name (Note: The US, France and Great Britain have code-named their test events, while the USSR and China did not, and therefore have only test numbers (with some exceptions – Soviet peaceful explosions were named). Word translations into English in parentheses unless the name is a proper noun. A dash followed by a number indicates a member of a salvo event. The US also sometimes named the individual explosions in such a salvo test, which results in "name1 – 1(with name2)". If test is canceled or aborted, then the row data like date and location discloses the intended plans, where known.)	Date time (UT)	Local time zone (Note: To convert the UT time into standard local, add the number of hours in parentheses to the UT time; for local daylight saving time, add one additional hour. If the result is earlier than 00:00, add 24 hours and subtract 1 from the day; if it is 24:00 or later, subtract 24 hours and add 1 to the day. Historical time zone data obtained from the IANA time zone database.)	Location (Note: Rough place name and a latitude/longitude reference; for rocket-carried tests, the launch location is specified before the detonation location, if known. Some locations are extremely accurate; others (like airdrops and space blasts) may be quite inaccurate. "~" indicates a likely pro-forma rough location, shared with other tests in that same area.)	Elevation + height (Note: Elevation is the ground level at the point directly below the explosion relative to sea level; height is the additional distance added or subtracted by tower, balloon, shaft, tunnel, air drop or other contrivance. For rocket bursts the ground level is "N/A". In some cases it is not clear if the height is absolute or relative to ground, for example, Plumbbob/John. No number or units indicates the value is unknown, while "0" means zero. Sorting on this column is by elevation and height added together.)	Delivery, (Note: Atmospheric, airdrop, balloon, gun, cruise missile, rocket, surface, tower, and barge are all disallowed by the Partial Nuclear Test Ban Treaty. Sealed shaft and tunnel are underground, and remained useful under the PTBT. Intentional cratering tests are borderline; they occurred under the treaty, were sometimes protested, and generally overlooked if the test was declared to be a peaceful use.) Purpose (Note: Include weapons development, weapon effects, safety test, transport safety test, war, science, joint verification and industrial/peaceful, which may be further broken down.)	Device (Note: Designations for test items where known, "?" indicates some uncertainty about the preceding value, nicknames for particular devices in quotes. This category of information is often not officially disclosed.)	Yield (Note: Estimated energy yield in tons, kilotons, and megatons. A ton of TNT equivalent is defined as 4.184 gigajoules (1 gigacalorie).)	Fallout (Note: Radioactive emission to the atmosphere aside from prompt neutrons, where known. The measured species is only iodine-131 if mentioned, otherwise it is all species. No entry means unknown, probably none if underground and "all" if not; otherwise notation for whether measured on the site only or off the site, where known, and the measured amount of radioactivity released.)	References	Notes
588 - 1	19 February 1982 03:56:13.42	ALMT (6 hrs)	Degelen, Semipalatinsk, Kazakhstan: 150 49.8136°N 78.0319°E	623 m (2,044 ft) +	tunnel, weapons development		24 kt			
588 - 2	19 February 1982 03:56:13.4	ALMT (6 hrs)	Degelen, Semipalatinsk, Kazakhstan: 150 49.8136°N 78.0319°E	623 m (2,044 ft) +	tunnel, weapons development		unknown yield			
unnumbered #6	6 April 1982	ALMT (6 hrs)	Degelen, Semipalatinsk, Kazakhstan: 136-3p 49.834°N 78.08°E	+	tunnel,		less than 0.001 kt			
589 - 1	25 April 1982 03:23:07.99	ALMT (6 hrs)	Balapan, Semipalatinsk, Kazakhstan: 1219 49.9189°N 78.88625°E	330 m (1,080 ft) +	underground shaft, fundamental science		145 kt			
589 - 2	25 April 1982 03:23:08.0	ALMT (6 hrs)	Balapan, Semipalatinsk, Kazakhstan: 1219 49.9189°N 78.88625°E	330 m (1,080 ft) +	underground shaft, fundamental science		unknown yield			
589 - 3	25 April 1982 03:23:08.0	ALMT (6 hrs)	Balapan, Semipalatinsk, Kazakhstan: 1219 49.9189°N 78.88625°E	330 m (1,080 ft) +	underground shaft, fundamental science		unknown yield			
590 - 1	25 June 1982 02:03:07.16	ALMT (6 hrs)	Degelen, Semipalatinsk, Kazakhstan: 196 49.7749°N 78.0996°E	590 m (1,940 ft) +	tunnel, weapon effect		2.4 kt			
590 - 2	25 June 1982 02:03:07.2	ALMT (6 hrs)	Degelen, Semipalatinsk, Kazakhstan: 196 49.7749°N 78.0996°E	590 m (1,940 ft) +	tunnel, weapons development		unknown yield			
591 - 1	4 July 1982 01:17:16.68	ALMT (6 hrs)	Balapan, Semipalatinsk, Kazakhstan: 1321 49.95861°N 78.81167°E	330 m (1,080 ft) +	underground shaft, weapons development		136 kt			
591 - 2	4 July 1982 01:17:16.7	ALMT (6 hrs)	Balapan, Semipalatinsk, Kazakhstan: 1321 49.95861°N 78.81167°E	330 m (1,080 ft) +	underground shaft, weapons development		unknown yield			
591 - 3	4 July 1982 01:17:16.7	ALMT (6 hrs)	Balapan, Semipalatinsk, Kazakhstan: 1321 49.95861°N 78.81167°E	330 m (1,080 ft) +	underground shaft, weapons development		unknown yield			
592 Rift 3	30 July 1982 21:00:00.0	IRKT (8 hrs)	Irkutsk, Russia: RF-3 53.8°N 104.15°E	– 860 m (2,820 ft)	underground shaft, seismic sounding		8.5 kt			Seismic probing program. 80 km NE Ust-Ordnyski.
593 - 1	23 August 1982 02:43:06.7	ALMT (6 hrs)	Degelen, Semipalatinsk, Kazakhstan: 14p 49.7473°N 78.0331°E	665 m (2,182 ft) +	tunnel, weapons development		1.7 kt			
593 - 2	23 August 1982 02:43:06.7	ALMT (6 hrs)	Degelen, Semipalatinsk, Kazakhstan: 14p 49.7473°N 78.0331°E	665 m (2,182 ft) +	tunnel, weapons development		unknown yield			
594 - 1	31 August 1982 01:31:03.19	ALMT (6 hrs)	Balapan, Semipalatinsk, Kazakhstan: 1317 49.91477°N 78.76122°E	330 m (1,080 ft) +	underground shaft, weapons development		8 kt			
594 - 2	31 August 1982 01:31:03.2	ALMT (6 hrs)	Balapan, Semipalatinsk, Kazakhstan: 1317 49.91477°N 78.76122°E	330 m (1,080 ft) +	underground shaft, weapons development		unknown yield			
595 Rift 1	4 September 1982 18:00:00.1	SVET (5 hrs)	Yamalo-Nenets, Russia: RF-1 69.2°N 81.65°E	– 960 m (3,150 ft)	underground shaft, seismic sounding		16 kt			Seismic probing program. 190 km W Dudinka.
596 - 1	21 September 1982 02:57:03.17	ALMT (6 hrs)	Degelen, Semipalatinsk, Kazakhstan: 203 49.7839°N 78.1347°E	587 m (1,926 ft) +	tunnel, weapons development		<20 kt			
596 - 2	21 September 1982 02:57:03.2	ALMT (6 hrs)	Degelen, Semipalatinsk, Kazakhstan: 203 49.7839°N 78.1347°E	587 m (1,926 ft) +	tunnel, weapons development		<20 kt			
597 Rift 4	25 September 1982 18:00:00.2	KRAT (7 hrs)	Krasnoyarsk, Russia: RF-4 64.35°N 91.8°E	– 550 m (1,800 ft)	underground shaft, seismic sounding		8.5 kt			Seismic probing program. 25 km SE Nogonsk, Krasnoyarsk.
598 Neva 1	10 October 1982 05:00:00.2	YAKT (9 hrs)	Sakha, Russia: 66 61.55°N 112.85°E	– 1,500 m (4,900 ft)	underground shaft, oil stimulation		15 kt			Oil recovery intensification. 120 km SW Mirnyi.
599 - 1	11 October 1982 07:14:58.63	MSK (3 hrs)	NZ Area B, Matochkin Shar, Novaya Zemlya, Russia: A-37 ZR-1 73.339°N 54.608°E	250 m (820 ft) +	tunnel, weapons development		80 kt	Venting detected on site, 1 kCi (37 TBq)		
599 - 2	11 October 1982 07:14:58.6	MSK (3 hrs)	NZ Area B, Matochkin Shar, Novaya Zemlya, Russia: A-37 ZR-2 73.339°N 54.608°E	350 m (1,150 ft) +	tunnel, weapons development		unknown yield			
599 - 3	11 October 1982 07:14:58.6	MSK (3 hrs)	NZ Area B, Matochkin Shar, Novaya Zemlya, Russia: A-37 ZR-3 73.339°N 54.608°E	450 m (1,480 ft) +	tunnel, weapons development		unknown yield			
599 - 4	11 October 1982 07:14:58.6	MSK (3 hrs)	NZ Area B, Matochkin Shar, Novaya Zemlya, Russia: A-37 ZR-4 73.339°N 54.608°E	520 m (1,710 ft) +	tunnel, weapons development		unknown yield	Venting detected on site, 1 kCi (37 TBq)		
600 Vega 7T	16 October 1982 06:00:00.2	VOLT (4 hrs)	Astrakhan, Russia: 7T 46.75823°N 48.24466°E	10 m (33 ft) – 975 m (3,199 ft)	underground shaft, cavity excavation		13.5 kt			Create reservoirs for gas storage.
601 Vega 6T	16 October 1982 06:05:00.1	VOLT (4 hrs)	Astrakhan, Russia: 6T 46.74941°N 48.25691°E	10 m (33 ft) – 990 m (3,250 ft)	underground shaft, cavity excavation		8.5 kt			Create reservoirs for gas storage.
602 Vega 5T	16 October 1982 06:10:00.1	VOLT (4 hrs)	Astrakhan, Russia: 5T 46.766°N 48.288°E	10 m (33 ft) – 1,100 m (3,600 ft)	underground shaft, cavity excavation		8.5 kt			Create reservoirs for gas storage.
603 Vega 3T	16 October 1982 06:15:00.2	VOLT (4 hrs)	Astrakhan, Russia: 3T 46.75972°N 48.29865°E	10 m (33 ft) – 1,060 m (3,480 ft)	underground shaft, cavity excavation		8.5 kt			Create reservoirs for gas storage.
604 - 1	5 December 1982 03:37:15.12	ALMT (6 hrs)	Balapan, Semipalatinsk, Kazakhstan: 1314 49.93199°N 78.80857°E	330 m (1,080 ft) +	underground shaft, weapons development		119 kt			
604 - 2	5 December 1982 03:37:15.1	ALMT (6 hrs)	Balapan, Semipalatinsk, Kazakhstan: 1314 49.93083°N 78.80972°E	330 m (1,080 ft) +	underground shaft, weapons development		unknown yield			
605 - 1	25 December 1982 04:23:08.38	ALMT (6 hrs)	Degelen, Semipalatinsk, Kazakhstan: 172 49.7763°N 78.028°E	706 m (2,316 ft) – 112 m (367 ft)	tunnel, weapons development		1.7 kt			
605 - 2	25 December 1982 04:23:08.4	ALMT (6 hrs)	Degelen, Semipalatinsk, Kazakhstan: 172 49.7763°N 78.028°E	706 m (2,316 ft) +	tunnel, weapons development		unknown yield			
606 - 1	26 December 1982 03:35:16.67	ALMT (6 hrs)	Balapan, Semipalatinsk, Kazakhstan: 1415 50.06887°N 78.99323°E	330 m (1,080 ft) +	underground shaft, fundamental science		21 kt			
606 - 2	26 December 1982 03:35:16.7	ALMT (6 hrs)	Balapan, Semipalatinsk, Kazakhstan: 1415 50.06887°N 78.99323°E	330 m (1,080 ft) +	underground shaft, weapons development		21 kt			
