= 1977 Soviet nuclear tests =

1977
- Nuclear blast animation

Information
- Country: Soviet Union
- Test site: Atyrau, Kazakhstan; Balapan, Semipalatinsk, Kazakhstan; Degelen, Semipalatinsk, Kazakhstan; Irkutsk, Russia; Krasnoyarsk, Russia; NZ Area B, Matochkin Shar, Novaya Zemlya, Russia; Sary-Uzen/Murzhik, Semipalatinsk, Kazakhstan; Zabaykalsky (then Chita), Russia
- Period: 1977
- Number of tests: 24
- Test type: underground shaft, tunnel
- Max. yield: 120 kilotonnes of TNT (500 TJ)

Test series chronology

The Soviet Union's 1977 nuclear test series was a group of 24 nuclear tests conducted in 1977. These tests (Note: A bomb test may be a salvo test, defined as two or more explosions "where a period of time between successive individual explosions does not exceed 5 seconds and where the burial points of all explosive devices can be connected by segments of straight lines, each of them connecting two burial points and does not exceed 40 kilometers in length". Mikhailov, V. N. "Catalog of World Wide Nuclear Testing". Begell-Atom, LLC. Archived from the original on 2014-04-26.) followed the 1976 Soviet nuclear tests series and preceded the 1978 Soviet nuclear tests series.

Soviet Union's 1977 series tests and detonations
Name (Note: The US, France and Great Britain have code-named their test events, while the USSR and China did not, and therefore have only test numbers (with some exceptions – Soviet peaceful explosions were named). Word translations into English in parentheses unless the name is a proper noun. A dash followed by a number indicates a member of a salvo event. The US also sometimes named the individual explosions in such a salvo test, which results in "name1 – 1(with name2)". If test is canceled or aborted, then the row data like date and location discloses the intended plans, where known.)	Date time (UT)	Local time zone (Note: To convert the UT time into standard local, add the number of hours in parentheses to the UT time; for local daylight saving time, add one additional hour. If the result is earlier than 00:00, add 24 hours and subtract 1 from the day; if it is 24:00 or later, subtract 24 hours and add 1 to the day. Historical time zone data obtained from the IANA time zone database.)	Location (Note: Rough place name and a latitude/longitude reference; for rocket-carried tests, the launch location is specified before the detonation location, if known. Some locations are extremely accurate; others (like airdrops and space blasts) may be quite inaccurate. "~" indicates a likely pro-forma rough location, shared with other tests in that same area.)	Elevation + height (Note: Elevation is the ground level at the point directly below the explosion relative to sea level; height is the additional distance added or subtracted by tower, balloon, shaft, tunnel, air drop or other contrivance. For rocket bursts the ground level is "N/A". In some cases it is not clear if the height is absolute or relative to ground, for example, Plumbbob/John. No number or units indicates the value is unknown, while "0" means zero. Sorting on this column is by elevation and height added together.)	Delivery, (Note: Atmospheric, airdrop, balloon, gun, cruise missile, rocket, surface, tower, and barge are all disallowed by the Partial Nuclear Test Ban Treaty. Sealed shaft and tunnel are underground, and remained useful under the PTBT. Intentional cratering tests are borderline; they occurred under the treaty, were sometimes protested, and generally overlooked if the test was declared to be a peaceful use.) Purpose (Note: Include weapons development, weapon effects, safety test, transport safety test, war, science, joint verification and industrial/peaceful, which may be further broken down.)	Device (Note: Designations for test items where known, "?" indicates some uncertainty about the preceding value, nicknames for particular devices in quotes. This category of information is often not officially disclosed.)	Yield (Note: Estimated energy yield in tons, kilotons, and megatons. A ton of TNT equivalent is defined as 4.184 gigajoules (1 gigacalorie).)	Fallout (Note: Radioactive emission to the atmosphere aside from prompt neutrons, where known. The measured species is only iodine-131 if mentioned, otherwise it is all species. No entry means unknown, probably none if underground and "all" if not; otherwise notation for whether measured on the site only or off the site, where known, and the measured amount of radioactivity released.)	References	Notes
458	29 March 1977 03:56:58	ALMT (6 hrs)	Sary-Uzen/Murzhik, Semipalatinsk, Kazakhstan: 130 49.97°N 78.086°E	460 m (1,510 ft) +	underground shaft, weapons development		24 kt			Supposed to be in the Sary-Uzen test area, simultaneous with 457 in Degelen.
457 - 1	29 March 1977 03:56:59.95	ALMT (6 hrs)	Degelen, Semipalatinsk, Kazakhstan: 707 49.7704°N 78.0136°E	735 m (2,411 ft) +	tunnel, weapons development		25 kt			
457 - 2	29 March 1977 03:57:00.0	ALMT (6 hrs)	Degelen, Semipalatinsk, Kazakhstan: 707 49.7704°N 78.0136°E	735 m (2,411 ft) +	tunnel, weapons development		unknown yield			
457 - 3	29 March 1977 03:57:00.0	ALMT (6 hrs)	Degelen, Semipalatinsk, Kazakhstan: 707 49.7704°N 78.0136°E	735 m (2,411 ft) +	tunnel, safety experiment		1000 kg			Simultaneous with 458.
459	25 April 1977 04:07:00.16	ALMT (6 hrs)	Degelen, Semipalatinsk, Kazakhstan: 604p 49.8076°N 78.1144°E	770 m (2,530 ft) +	tunnel, weapons development		10 kt			
460	29 May 1977 02:57:00.13	ALMT (6 hrs)	Balapan, Semipalatinsk, Kazakhstan: 1400 49.94639°N 78.77167°E	330 m (1,080 ft) +	underground shaft, weapons development		44 kt			
461	29 June 1977 03:07:00.24	ALMT (6 hrs)	Balapan, Semipalatinsk, Kazakhstan: 1080 50.00211°N 78.86589°E	330 m (1,080 ft) +	underground shaft, weapons development		9 kt			
462 Meteorit 2 (Meteorite)	26 July 1977 17:00:00.2	KRAT (7 hrs)	Krasnoyarsk, Russia: M2 69.575°N 90.375°E	– 880 m (2,890 ft)	underground shaft, seismic sounding		15 kt			Seismic probing program.
463 - 1	30 July 1977 01:57:00.11	ALMT (6 hrs)	Degelen, Semipalatinsk, Kazakhstan: 175 49.75°N 78.0399°E	682 m (2,238 ft) +	tunnel, weapons development		11 kt			
463 - 2	30 July 1977 01:57:00.1	ALMT (6 hrs)	Degelen, Semipalatinsk, Kazakhstan: 175 49.75°N 78.0399°E	682 m (2,238 ft) +	tunnel, weapons development		unknown yield			
464 Meteorit 5 (Meteorite)	10 August 1977 22:00:00.1	YAKT (9 hrs)	Zabaykalsky (then Chita), Russia: M5 50.955°N 110.983°E	685 m (2,247 ft) – 490 m (1,610 ft)	underground shaft, seismic sounding		8.5 kt			Seismic probing program.
465	17 August 1977 04:26:59.97	ALMT (6 hrs)	Degelen, Semipalatinsk, Kazakhstan: 111 49.82615°N 78.12007°E	640 m (2,100 ft) +	tunnel, weapons development		8 kt			
466 Meteorit 3 (Meteorite)	20 August 1977 22:00:00.8	KRAT (7 hrs)	Krasnoyarsk, Russia: M3 64.108°N 99.558°E	– 600 m (2,000 ft)	underground shaft, seismic sounding		8.5 kt			Seismic probing program.
467 - 1	1 September 1977 02:59:57.97	MSK (3 hrs)	NZ Area B, Matochkin Shar, Novaya Zemlya, Russia: A-17 73.339°N 54.619°E	100 m (330 ft) – 600 m (2,000 ft)	tunnel, weapons development		120 kt			
467 - 2	1 September 1977 02:59:58.0	MSK (3 hrs)	NZ Area B, Matochkin Shar, Novaya Zemlya, Russia: A-17 73.339°N 54.619°E	100 m (330 ft) +	tunnel, weapons development		unknown yield			
467 - 3	1 September 1977 02:59:58.0	MSK (3 hrs)	NZ Area B, Matochkin Shar, Novaya Zemlya, Russia: A-17 73.339°N 54.619°E	100 m (330 ft) +	tunnel, weapons development		unknown yield			
467 - 4	1 September 1977 02:59:58.0	MSK (3 hrs)	NZ Area B, Matochkin Shar, Novaya Zemlya, Russia: A-17 73.339°N 54.619°E	100 m (330 ft) +	tunnel, weapons development		unknown yield			
468 - 1	5 September 1977 03:02:59.96	ALMT (6 hrs)	Balapan, Semipalatinsk, Kazakhstan: 1079 50.05666°N 78.93845°E	330 m (1,080 ft) +	underground shaft, weapons development		78 kt			
468 - 2	5 September 1977 03:03:00.0	ALMT (6 hrs)	Balapan, Semipalatinsk, Kazakhstan: 1079 50.05666°N 78.93845°E	330 m (1,080 ft) +	underground shaft, fundamental science		unknown yield			
469 Meteorit 4 (Meteorite)	10 September 1977 16:00:00.2	IRKT (8 hrs)	Irkutsk, Russia: M4 57.251°N 106.551°E	– 540 m (1,770 ft)	underground shaft, industrial		7.6 kt			Seismic probing program. 120 km NE Uzst-Kut.
470 Galit A5 (Halite)	30 September 1977 06:59:58.4	SHET (5 hrs)	Atyrau, Kazakhstan: A-V 47.89717°N 48.16124°E	– 1,500 m (4,900 ft)	underground shaft, industrial		10 kt			Create reservoirs for gas storage. Location looks like a subsidence crater.
471	9 October 1977 10:59:58.12	MSK (3 hrs)	NZ Area B, Matochkin Shar, Novaya Zemlya, Russia: A-7P 73.409°N 54.927°E	100 m (330 ft) – 160 m (520 ft)	tunnel, weapons development		5 kt	Venting detected off site, 3 kCi (110 TBq)		
472 Galit A2.2 (Halite)	14 October 1977 06:59:59.1	SHET (5 hrs)	Atyrau, Kazakhstan: A-II-3 47.909°N 47.912°E	– 600 m (2,000 ft)	underground shaft, industrial		100 t			Create reservoirs for gas storage. This shot was a fizzle.
473 - 1	29 October 1977 03:06:59.97	ALMT (6 hrs)	Degelen, Semipalatinsk, Kazakhstan: 136 49.8265°N 78.0801°E	638 m (2,093 ft) +	tunnel, weapons development		42 kt			
473 - 2	29 October 1977 03:07:00.0	ALMT (6 hrs)	Degelen, Semipalatinsk, Kazakhstan: 136 49.8265°N 78.0801°E	638 m (2,093 ft) +	tunnel, fundamental science		unknown yield			
474	29 October 1977 03:07:04.92	ALMT (6 hrs)	Balapan, Semipalatinsk, Kazakhstan: 1214 50.04851°N 78.98633°E	330 m (1,080 ft) +	underground shaft, weapons development		50 kt			
475 Galit A2.3 (Halite)	30 October 1977 06:59:59.1	SHET (5 hrs)	Atyrau, Kazakhstan: A-II-4 47.909°N 47.912°E	– 600 m (2,000 ft)	underground shaft, industrial		100 t			Create reservoirs for gas storage. A fizzle.
476	12 November 1977 05:11:00.0	ALMT (6 hrs)	Balapan, Semipalatinsk, Kazakhstan: 1073 50.05222°N 78.86444°E	330 m (1,080 ft) +	underground shaft, weapons development		unknown yield			
477	27 November 1977 03:57:00.0	ALMT (6 hrs)	Degelen, Semipalatinsk, Kazakhstan: 18p 49.75725°N 78.05279°E	537 m (1,762 ft) +	tunnel, weapons development		unknown yield			
478 - 1	30 November 1977 04:06:59.94	ALMT (6 hrs)	Balapan, Semipalatinsk, Kazakhstan: Glubokaya 49.96722°N 78.87444°E	330 m (1,080 ft) +	underground shaft, weapons development		70 kt			
478 - 2	30 November 1977 04:06:59.9	ALMT (6 hrs)	Balapan, Semipalatinsk, Kazakhstan: Glubokaya 49.96722°N 78.87444°E	330 m (1,080 ft) +	underground shaft, weapons development		unknown yield			
479	26 December 1977 04:03:??	ALMT (6 hrs)	Degelen, Semipalatinsk, Kazakhstan: 803 49.81683°N 78.05366°E	722 m (2,369 ft) +	tunnel, weapons development		unknown yield			
480 - 1	26 December 1977 04:03:00.24	ALMT (6 hrs)	Degelen, Semipalatinsk, Kazakhstan: 123p 49.80554°N 78.11539°E	752 m (2,467 ft) +	tunnel, weapons development		6 kt			
480 - 2	26 December 1977 04:03:00	ALMT (6 hrs)	Degelen, Semipalatinsk, Kazakhstan: 122p 49.80621°N 78.11687°E	711 m (2,333 ft) +	tunnel, weapons development		1000 kg			
480 - 3	26 December 1977 04:03:00	ALMT (6 hrs)	Degelen, Semipalatinsk, Kazakhstan: 122p 49.80621°N 78.11687°E	711 m (2,333 ft) +	tunnel, weapons development		unknown yield			
480 - 4	26 December 1977 04:03:00	ALMT (6 hrs)	Degelen, Semipalatinsk, Kazakhstan: 122p 49.80621°N 78.11687°E	711 m (2,333 ft) +	tunnel, weapons development		unknown yield			
