= 1983 Soviet nuclear tests =

1983

Information
- Country: Soviet Union
- Test site: Astrakhan, Russia; Balapan, Semipalatinsk, Kazakhstan; Degelen, Semipalatinsk, Kazakhstan; NZ Area B, Matochkin Shar, Novaya Zemlya, Russia; Western Kazakhstan
- Period: 1983
- Number of tests: 27
- Test type: underground shaft, tunnel
- Max. yield: 150 kilotonnes of TNT (630 TJ)

Test series chronology

The Soviet Union's 1983 nuclear test series was a group of 27 nuclear tests conducted in 1983. These tests (Note: A bomb test may be a salvo test, defined as two or more explosions "where a period of time between successive individual explosions does not exceed 5 seconds and where the burial points of all explosive devices can be connected by segments of straight lines, each of them connecting two burial points and does not exceed 40 kilometers in length". Mikhailov, V. N. "Catalog of World Wide Nuclear Testing". Begell-Atom, LLC. Archived from the original on 2014-04-26.) followed the 1982 Soviet nuclear tests series and preceded the 1984 Soviet nuclear tests series.

Soviet Union's 1983 series tests and detonations
Name (Note: The US, France and Great Britain have code-named their test events, while the USSR and China did not, and therefore have only test numbers (with some exceptions – Soviet peaceful explosions were named). Word translations into English in parentheses unless the name is a proper noun. A dash followed by a number indicates a member of a salvo event. The US also sometimes named the individual explosions in such a salvo test, which results in "name1 – 1(with name2)". If test is canceled or aborted, then the row data like date and location discloses the intended plans, where known.)	Date time (UT)	Local time zone (Note: To convert the UT time into standard local, add the number of hours in parentheses to the UT time; for local daylight saving time, add one additional hour. If the result is earlier than 00:00, add 24 hours and subtract 1 from the day; if it is 24:00 or later, subtract 24 hours and add 1 to the day. Historical time zone data obtained from the IANA time zone database.)	Location (Note: Rough place name and a latitude/longitude reference; for rocket-carried tests, the launch location is specified before the detonation location, if known. Some locations are extremely accurate; others (like airdrops and space blasts) may be quite inaccurate. "~" indicates a likely pro-forma rough location, shared with other tests in that same area.)	Elevation + height (Note: Elevation is the ground level at the point directly below the explosion relative to sea level; height is the additional distance added or subtracted by tower, balloon, shaft, tunnel, air drop or other contrivance. For rocket bursts the ground level is "N/A". In some cases it is not clear if the height is absolute or relative to ground, for example, Plumbbob/John. No number or units indicates the value is unknown, while "0" means zero. Sorting on this column is by elevation and height added together.)	Delivery, (Note: Atmospheric, airdrop, balloon, gun, cruise missile, rocket, surface, tower, and barge are all disallowed by the Partial Nuclear Test Ban Treaty. Sealed shaft and tunnel are underground, and remained useful under the PTBT. Intentional cratering tests are borderline; they occurred under the treaty, were sometimes protested, and generally overlooked if the test was declared to be a peaceful use.) Purpose (Note: Include weapons development, weapon effects, safety test, transport safety test, war, science, joint verification and industrial/peaceful, which may be further broken down.)	Device (Note: Designations for test items where known, "?" indicates some uncertainty about the preceding value, nicknames for particular devices in quotes. This category of information is often not officially disclosed.)	Yield (Note: Estimated energy yield in tons, kilotons, and megatons. A ton of TNT equivalent is defined as 4.184 gigajoules (1 gigacalorie).)	Fallout (Note: Radioactive emission to the atmosphere aside from prompt neutrons, where known. The measured species is only iodine-131 if mentioned, otherwise it is all species. No entry means unknown, probably none if underground and "all" if not; otherwise notation for whether measured on the site only or off the site, where known, and the measured amount of radioactivity released.)	References	Notes
607	11 March 1983	ALMT (6 hrs)	Degelen, Semipalatinsk, Kazakhstan: 150p 49.81438°N 78.03204°E	623 m (2,044 ft) +	tunnel, safety experiment		1000 kg			
608	30 March 1983 04:17:10.22	ALMT (6 hrs)	Degelen, Semipalatinsk, Kazakhstan: 177 49.781°N 78.0413°E	670 m (2,200 ft) +	tunnel, weapons development		2.7 kt			
unnumbered #7	11 April 1983	ALMT (6 hrs)	Degelen, Semipalatinsk, Kazakhstan: 150-2p 49.823°N 78.033°E	+	tunnel,		no yield			
609	12 April 1983 03:41:08.26	ALMT (6 hrs)	Degelen, Semipalatinsk, Kazakhstan: 186 49.791°N 78.0807°E	672 m (2,205 ft) +	tunnel, weapon effect		3 kt			
610 - 1	30 May 1983 03:33:47.04	ALMT (6 hrs)	Degelen, Semipalatinsk, Kazakhstan: 215 49.7439°N 78.1127°E	533 m (1,749 ft) – 245 m (804 ft)	tunnel, fundamental science		20 kt			
610 - 2	30 May 1983 03:33:47.0	ALMT (6 hrs)	Degelen, Semipalatinsk, Kazakhstan: 215 49.7439°N 78.1127°E	533 m (1,749 ft) – 180 m (590 ft)	tunnel, weapons development		unknown yield			
unnumbered #8	9 June 1983	ALMT (6 hrs)	Degelen, Semipalatinsk, Kazakhstan: 150-3p 49.823°N 78.033°E	+	tunnel,		no yield			
611 - 1	12 June 1983 02:36:46.12	ALMT (6 hrs)	Balapan, Semipalatinsk, Kazakhstan: 1320 49.925°N 78.89806°E	330 m (1,080 ft) +	underground shaft, weapons development		138 kt			
611 - 2	12 June 1983 02:36:46.1	ALMT (6 hrs)	Balapan, Semipalatinsk, Kazakhstan: 1320 49.925°N 78.89806°E	330 m (1,080 ft) +	underground shaft, weapons development		unknown yield			
612	24 June 1983 02:56:13.85	ALMT (6 hrs)	Degelen, Semipalatinsk, Kazakhstan: 176p 49.7459°N 78.0374°E	652 m (2,139 ft) +	tunnel, weapons development		1.8 kt			
613 Lira 1T (Lyra)	10 July 1983 04:00:00.0	URAT1 (6 hrs)	Western Kazakhstan: 1T 51.36273°N 53.30564°E	76 m (249 ft) – 910 m (2,990 ft)	tunnel, cavity excavation		15 kt			Create reservoirs for gas storage.
614 Lira 2T (Lyra)	10 July 1983 04:04:59.9	URAT1 (6 hrs)	Western Kazakhstan: 2T 51.36604°N 53.32581°E	70 m (230 ft) – 920 m (3,020 ft)	tunnel, cavity excavation		15 kt			Create reservoirs for gas storage.
615 Lira 3T (Lyra)	10 July 1983 04:09:59.9	URAT1 (6 hrs)	Western Kazakhstan: 3T 51.38024°N 53.33879°E	69 m (226 ft) – 840 m (2,760 ft)	tunnel, cavity excavation		15 kt			Create reservoirs for gas storage.
616 - 1	18 August 1983 16:09:58.9	MSK (3 hrs)	NZ Area B, Matochkin Shar, Novaya Zemlya, Russia: A-40 73.354°N 54.974°E	100 m (330 ft) +	tunnel, weapons development		150 kt	Venting detected on site, 2 Ci (74 GBq)		
616 - 2	18 August 1983 16:09:58.9	MSK (3 hrs)	NZ Area B, Matochkin Shar, Novaya Zemlya, Russia: A-40 73.354°N 54.974°E	100 m (330 ft) +	tunnel, weapons development		unknown yield			
616 - 3	18 August 1983 16:09:58.9	MSK (3 hrs)	NZ Area B, Matochkin Shar, Novaya Zemlya, Russia: A-40 73.354°N 54.974°E	100 m (330 ft) +	tunnel, weapons development		unknown yield			
616 - 4	18 August 1983 16:09:58.9	MSK (3 hrs)	NZ Area B, Matochkin Shar, Novaya Zemlya, Russia: A-40 73.354°N 54.974°E	100 m (330 ft) +	tunnel, peaceful research		unknown yield			
616 - 5	18 August 1983 16:09:58.9	MSK (3 hrs)	NZ Area B, Matochkin Shar, Novaya Zemlya, Russia: A-40 73.354°N 54.974°E	100 m (330 ft) +	tunnel, safety experiment		unknown yield			
617 Dynamica (Dynamic)	11 September 1983 06:33:13.1	ALMT (6 hrs)	Degelen, Semipalatinsk, Kazakhstan: K-2 49.7854°N 78.0806°E	665 m (2,182 ft) +	tunnel, weapon effect		1.9 kt			
618 Vega 8T	24 September 1983 05:00:00.0	VOLT (4 hrs)	Astrakhan, Russia: 8RT 46.783°N 48.315°E	10 m (33 ft) – 1,050 m (3,440 ft)	underground shaft, cavity excavation		8.5 kt			Create reservoirs for gas storage. 35 km N Astrakhan.
619 Vega 9T	24 September 1983 05:05:00.0	VOLT (4 hrs)	Astrakhan, Russia: 9RT 46.78719°N 48.29647°E	10 m (33 ft) – 1,050 m (3,440 ft)	underground shaft, cavity excavation		8.5 kt			Create reservoirs for gas storage.
620 Vega 11T	24 September 1983 05:10:00.1	VOLT (4 hrs)	Astrakhan, Russia: 11RT 46.76704°N 48.30789°E	10 m (33 ft) – 920 m (3,020 ft)	underground shaft, cavity excavation		8.5 kt			Create reservoirs for gas storage.
621 Vega 13T	24 September 1983 05:15:00.1	VOLT (4 hrs)	Astrakhan, Russia: 13RT 46.75002°N 48.30064°E	10 m (33 ft) – 1,100 m (3,600 ft)	underground shaft, cavity excavation		8.5 kt			Create reservoirs for gas storage.
622 Vega 10T	24 September 1983 05:19:59.9	VOLT (4 hrs)	Astrakhan, Russia: 10RT 46.75386°N 48.28686°E	10 m (33 ft) – 950 m (3,120 ft)	underground shaft, cavity excavation		8.5 kt			Create reservoirs for gas storage.
623 Vega 12T	24 September 1983 05:25:00.0	VOLT (4 hrs)	Astrakhan, Russia: 12RT 46.766°N 48.274°E	10 m (33 ft) – 1,070 m (3,510 ft)	underground shaft, cavity excavation		8.5 kt			Create reservoirs for gas storage.
624 - 1	25 September 1983 13:09:58.22	MSK (3 hrs)	NZ Area B, Matochkin Shar, Novaya Zemlya, Russia: A-21 73.328°N 54.541°E	100 m (330 ft) – 500 m (1,600 ft)	tunnel, weapons development		100 kt	Venting detected on site, 41 Ci (1,500 GBq)		
624 - 2	25 September 1983 13:09:58.2	MSK (3 hrs)	NZ Area B, Matochkin Shar, Novaya Zemlya, Russia: A-21 73.328°N 54.541°E	100 m (330 ft) +	tunnel, weapons development		unknown yield			
624 - 3	25 September 1983 13:09:58.2	MSK (3 hrs)	NZ Area B, Matochkin Shar, Novaya Zemlya, Russia: A-21 73.328°N 54.541°E	100 m (330 ft) +	tunnel, weapons development		unknown yield			
624 - 4	25 September 1983 13:09:58.2	MSK (3 hrs)	NZ Area B, Matochkin Shar, Novaya Zemlya, Russia: A-21 73.328°N 54.541°E	100 m (330 ft) +	tunnel, weapon effect		unknown yield			
625 - 1	6 October 1983 01:47:09.17	ALMT (6 hrs)	Balapan, Semipalatinsk, Kazakhstan: 1325 49.92564°N 78.75641°E	330 m (1,080 ft) +	underground shaft, weapons development		82 kt			
625 - 2	6 October 1983 01:47:09.2	ALMT (6 hrs)	Balapan, Semipalatinsk, Kazakhstan: 1325 49.92564°N 78.75641°E	330 m (1,080 ft) +	underground shaft, weapons development		unknown yield			
626	26 October 1983 01:55:07.42	ALMT (6 hrs)	Balapan, Semipalatinsk, Kazakhstan: 1307 49.91386°N 78.82366°E	330 m (1,080 ft) +	underground shaft, weapons development		114 kt			
627	2 November 1983 04:18:54.0	ALMT (6 hrs)	Degelen, Semipalatinsk, Kazakhstan: 203p 49.78416°N 78.13533°E	587 m (1,926 ft) +	tunnel, weapons development		unknown yield			
628 - 1	20 November 1983 03:27:06.9	ALMT (6 hrs)	Balapan, Semipalatinsk, Kazakhstan: 1235 50.05599°N 78.99734°E	330 m (1,080 ft) +	underground shaft, weapons development		20 kt			
628 - 2	20 November 1983 03:27:06.9	ALMT (6 hrs)	Balapan, Semipalatinsk, Kazakhstan: 1235 50.05599°N 78.99734°E	330 m (1,080 ft) +	underground shaft, weapons development		unknown yield			
629	29 November 1983 02:19:??	ALMT (6 hrs)	Degelen, Semipalatinsk, Kazakhstan: 216 49.7355°N 78.0994°E	681 m (2,234 ft) +	tunnel, weapons development		unknown yield			
630 - 1	29 November 1983 02:19:08.8	ALMT (6 hrs)	Degelen, Semipalatinsk, Kazakhstan: 180 49.76203°N 78.0505°E	823 m (2,700 ft) +	tunnel, weapons development		19 kt			
630 - 2	29 November 1983 02:19:08.8	ALMT (6 hrs)	Degelen, Semipalatinsk, Kazakhstan: 180 49.76203°N 78.0505°E	823 m (2,700 ft) +	tunnel, weapons development		unknown yield			
631	26 December 1983 04:29:09.25	ALMT (6 hrs)	Degelen, Semipalatinsk, Kazakhstan: 129 49.7975°N 78.1036°E	611 m (2,005 ft) +	tunnel, fundamental science		30 kt			
