= 1975 Soviet nuclear tests =

1975
- Nuclear blast animation

Information
- Country: Soviet Union
- Test site: Atyrau, Kazakhstan; Balapan, Semipalatinsk, Kazakhstan; Degelen, Semipalatinsk, Kazakhstan; Krasnoyarsk, Russia; NZ Area A, Chyornaya Guba, Novaya Zemlya, Russia; NZ Area B, Matochkin Shar, Novaya Zemlya, Russia; Sakha, Russia
- Period: 1975
- Number of tests: 19
- Test type: underground shaft, tunnel
- Max. yield: 1.3 megatonnes of TNT (5.4 PJ)

Test series chronology

The Soviet Union's 1975 nuclear test series was a group of 19 nuclear tests conducted in 1975. These tests (Note: A bomb test may be a salvo test, defined as two or more explosions "where a period of time between successive individual explosions does not exceed 5 seconds and where the burial points of all explosive devices can be connected by segments of straight lines, each of them connecting two burial points and does not exceed 40 kilometers in length". Mikhailov, V. N. "Catalog of World Wide Nuclear Testing". Begell-Atom, LLC. Archived from the original on 2014-04-26.) followed the 1974 Soviet nuclear tests series and preceded the 1976 Soviet nuclear tests series.

Soviet Union's 1975 series tests and detonations
| Name (Note: The US, France and Great Britain have code-named their test events, while the USSR and China did not, and therefore have only test numbers (with some exceptions – Soviet peaceful explosions were named). Word translations into English in parentheses unless the name is a proper noun. A dash followed by a number indicates a member of a salvo event. The US also sometimes named the individual explosions in such a salvo test, which results in "name1 – 1(with name2)". If test is canceled or aborted, then the row data like date and location discloses the intended plans, where known.) | Date time (UT) | Local time zone (Note: To convert the UT time into standard local, add the number of hours in parentheses to the UT time; for local daylight saving time, add one additional hour. If the result is earlier than 00:00, add 24 hours and subtract 1 from the day; if it is 24:00 or later, subtract 24 hours and add 1 to the day. Historical time zone data obtained from the IANA time zone database.) | Location (Note: Rough place name and a latitude/longitude reference; for rocket-carried tests, the launch location is specified before the detonation location, if known. Some locations are extremely accurate; others (like airdrops and space blasts) may be quite inaccurate. "~" indicates a likely pro-forma rough location, shared with other tests in that same area.) | Elevation + height (Note: Elevation is the ground level at the point directly below the explosion relative to sea level; height is the additional distance added or subtracted by tower, balloon, shaft, tunnel, air drop or other contrivance. For rocket bursts the ground level is "N/A". In some cases it is not clear if the height is absolute or relative to ground, for example, Plumbbob/John. No number or units indicates the value is unknown, while "0" means zero. Sorting on this column is by elevation and height added together.) | Delivery, (Note: Atmospheric, airdrop, balloon, gun, cruise missile, rocket, surface, tower, and barge are all disallowed by the Partial Nuclear Test Ban Treaty. Sealed shaft and tunnel are underground, and remained useful under the PTBT. Intentional cratering tests are borderline; they occurred under the treaty, were sometimes protested, and generally overlooked if the test was declared to be a peaceful use.) Purpose (Note: Include weapons development, weapon effects, safety test, transport safety test, war, science, joint verification and industrial/peaceful, which may be further broken down.) | Device (Note: Designations for test items where known, "?" indicates some uncertainty about the preceding value, nicknames for particular devices in quotes. This category of information is often not officially disclosed.) | Yield (Note: Estimated energy yield in tons, kilotons, and megatons. A ton of TNT equivalent is defined as 4.184 gigajoules (1 gigacalorie).) | Fallout (Note: Radioactive emission to the atmosphere aside from prompt neutrons, where known. The measured species is only iodine-131 if mentioned, otherwise it is all species. No entry means unknown, probably none if underground and "all" if not; otherwise notation for whether measured on the site only or off the site, where known, and the measured amount of radioactivity released.) | References | Notes |
|---|---|---|---|---|---|---|---|---|---|---|
| 417 - 1 | 20 February 1975 05:33:00.0 | ALMT (6 hrs) | Degelen, Semipalatinsk, Kazakhstan: 163 49.77837°N 78.00296°E | 749 m (2,457 ft) + | tunnel, weapon effect | | unknown yield | | | |
| 417 - 2 | 20 February 1975 05:33:00.0 | ALMT (6 hrs) | Degelen, Semipalatinsk, Kazakhstan: 163 49.77837°N 78.00296°E | 749 m (2,457 ft) + | tunnel, weapon effect | | unknown yield | | | |
| 417 - 3 | 20 February 1975 05:33:00.0 | ALMT (6 hrs) | Degelen, Semipalatinsk, Kazakhstan: 163 49.77837°N 78.00296°E | 749 m (2,457 ft) + | tunnel, weapon effect | | unknown yield | | | |
| 418 | 20 February 1975 05:33:?? | ALMT (6 hrs) | Degelen, Semipalatinsk, Kazakhstan: 156 49.79516°N 78.0084°E | 665 m (2,182 ft) + | tunnel, weapon effect | | 55 kt | | | |
| 419 | 11 March 1975 05:43:00.1 | ALMT (6 hrs) | Degelen, Semipalatinsk, Kazakhstan: 101 49.7462°N 78.106°E | 650 m (2,130 ft) + | tunnel, weapons development | | 24 kt | | | |
| 420 Galit A2.1 (Halite) | 25 April 1975 05:00:00.0 | SHET (5 hrs) | Atyrau, Kazakhstan: A-II-2 47.909°N 47.912°E | – 600 m (2,000 ft) | underground shaft, industrial | | 350 t | | | A-II, in cavity produced by #280. |
| 421 | 27 April 1975 05:36:59.78 | ALMT (6 hrs) | Balapan, Semipalatinsk, Kazakhstan: 1205 49.94006°N 78.90611°E | 330 m (1,080 ft) + | underground shaft, weapons development | | 29 kt | | | |
| 422 | 8 June 1975 03:27:00.0 | ALMT (6 hrs) | Degelen, Semipalatinsk, Kazakhstan: 165 49.7606°N 78.0125°E | 722 m (2,369 ft) + | tunnel, peaceful research | | 32 kt | | | |
| 423 | 30 June 1975 03:27:00.25 | ALMT (6 hrs) | Balapan, Semipalatinsk, Kazakhstan: A 49.9862°N 78.89576°E | 330 m (1,080 ft) + | underground shaft, weapons development | | 8 kt | | | |
| 424 - 1 | 15 July 1975 02:57:00.0 | ALMT (6 hrs) | Degelen, Semipalatinsk, Kazakhstan: 133 49.79556°N 78.09568°E | 686 m (2,251 ft) + | tunnel, weapons development | | unknown yield | | | |
| 424 - 2 | 15 July 1975 02:57:00.0 | ALMT (6 hrs) | Degelen, Semipalatinsk, Kazakhstan: 133 49.79556°N 78.09568°E | 686 m (2,251 ft) + | tunnel, weapons development | | unknown yield | | | |
| 425 - 1 | 7 August 1975 03:57:00.1 | ALMT (6 hrs) | Degelen, Semipalatinsk, Kazakhstan: 122 49.8038°N 78.1234°E | 711 m (2,333 ft) + | tunnel, weapons development | | 14 kt | | | |
| 425 - 2 | 7 August 1975 03:57:00 | ALMT (6 hrs) | Degelen, Semipalatinsk, Kazakhstan: 123 49.80319°N 78.12254°E | 752 m (2,467 ft) + | tunnel, weapons development | | unknown yield | | | |
| 426 Gorizont 4 (Horizon) | 12 August 1975 15:00:00.6 | YAKT (9 hrs) | Sakha, Russia: G-4 70.76367°N 126.95232°E | – 500 m (1,600 ft) | underground shaft, seismic sounding | | 7.6 kt | | | Seismic probing program. 120 km SW Tiksi. |
| 427 - 1 | 23 August 1975 08:59:58.25 | MSK (3 hrs) | NZ Area B, Matochkin Shar, Novaya Zemlya, Russia: A-10 73.334°N 54.682°E | 100 m (330 ft) – 700 m (2,300 ft) | tunnel, weapon effect | | 1.1 Mt | Venting detected on site | | |
| 427 - 2 | 23 August 1975 08:59:58.3 | MSK (3 hrs) | NZ Area B, Matochkin Shar, Novaya Zemlya, Russia: A-10 73.334°N 54.682°E | 100 m (330 ft) + | tunnel, weapon effect | | unknown yield | | | |
| 427 - 3 | 23 August 1975 08:59:58.3 | MSK (3 hrs) | NZ Area B, Matochkin Shar, Novaya Zemlya, Russia: A-10 73.334°N 54.682°E | 100 m (330 ft) + | tunnel, weapon effect | | unknown yield | | | |
| 427 - 4 | 23 August 1975 08:59:58.3 | MSK (3 hrs) | NZ Area B, Matochkin Shar, Novaya Zemlya, Russia: A-10 73.334°N 54.682°E | 100 m (330 ft) + | tunnel, weapon effect | | unknown yield | | | |
| 427 - 5 | 23 August 1975 08:59:58.3 | MSK (3 hrs) | NZ Area B, Matochkin Shar, Novaya Zemlya, Russia: A-10 73.334°N 54.682°E | 100 m (330 ft) + | tunnel, weapons development | | unknown yield | | | |
| 427 - 6 | 23 August 1975 08:59:58.3 | MSK (3 hrs) | NZ Area B, Matochkin Shar, Novaya Zemlya, Russia: A-10 73.334°N 54.682°E | 100 m (330 ft) + | tunnel, weapons development | | unknown yield | | | |
| 427 - 7 | 23 August 1975 08:59:58.3 | MSK (3 hrs) | NZ Area B, Matochkin Shar, Novaya Zemlya, Russia: A-10 73.334°N 54.682°E | 100 m (330 ft) + | tunnel, weapons development | | unknown yield | | | |
| 427 - 8 | 23 August 1975 08:59:58.3 | MSK (3 hrs) | NZ Area B, Matochkin Shar, Novaya Zemlya, Russia: A-10 73.334°N 54.682°E | 100 m (330 ft) + | tunnel, weapons development | | unknown yield | | | |
| 428 Gorizont 3 (Horizon) | 29 September 1975 11:00:00.4 | KRAT (7 hrs) | Krasnoyarsk, Russia: G-3 69.578°N 90.337°E | – 830 m (2,720 ft) | underground shaft, seismic sounding | | 7.6 kt | | | Seismic probing program. 80 km E Norilsk. |
| 429 | 5 October 1975 04:27:00.0 | ALMT (6 hrs) | Degelen, Semipalatinsk, Kazakhstan: 192 49.78143°N 78.09052°E | 635 m (2,083 ft) + | tunnel, weapons development | | 200 t | | | |
| 431 | 18 October 1975 08:59:59.4 | MSK (3 hrs) | NZ Area A, Chyornaya Guba, Novaya Zemlya, Russia: Yu-7 70.795°N 53.712°E | 30 m (98 ft) + | underground shaft, weapons development | | 600 kt | | | |
| 430 - 1 | 18 October 1975 09:00:?? | MSK (3 hrs) | NZ Area A, Chyornaya Guba, Novaya Zemlya, Russia: Yu-6N 70.99°N 53.7°E | 30 m (98 ft) – 1,100 m (3,600 ft) | underground shaft, weapons development | | 600 kt | Venting detected | | |
| 430 - 2 | 18 October 1975 09:00:?? | MSK (3 hrs) | NZ Area A, Chyornaya Guba, Novaya Zemlya, Russia: Yu-6N 70.99°N 53.7°E | 30 m (98 ft) + | underground shaft, weapons development | | 600 kt | | | |
| 432 - 1 | 21 October 1975 11:59:58.03 | MSK (3 hrs) | NZ Area B, Matochkin Shar, Novaya Zemlya, Russia: A-12 73.31907°N 54.9269°E | 100 m (330 ft) – 700 m (2,300 ft) | tunnel, weapons development | | 1.3 Mt | Venting detected off site, 300 kCi (11,000 TBq) | | |
| 432 - 2 | 21 October 1975 11:59:58.0 | MSK (3 hrs) | NZ Area B, Matochkin Shar, Novaya Zemlya, Russia: A-12 73.3158°N 54.93087°E | 100 m (330 ft) + | tunnel, weapons development | | unknown yield | | | |
| 432 - 3 | 21 October 1975 11:59:58.0 | MSK (3 hrs) | NZ Area B, Matochkin Shar, Novaya Zemlya, Russia: A-12 73.31435°N 54.93673°E | 100 m (330 ft) + | tunnel, weapons development | | unknown yield | | | |
| 432 - 4 | 21 October 1975 11:59:58.0 | MSK (3 hrs) | NZ Area B, Matochkin Shar, Novaya Zemlya, Russia: A-12 73.31435°N 54.93673°E | 100 m (330 ft) + | tunnel, weapons development | | unknown yield | | | |
| 432 - 5 | 21 October 1975 11:59:58.0 | MSK (3 hrs) | NZ Area B, Matochkin Shar, Novaya Zemlya, Russia: A-12 73.31435°N 54.93673°E | 100 m (330 ft) + | tunnel, weapons development | | unknown yield | | | |
| 433 | 29 October 1975 04:46:59.89 | ALMT (6 hrs) | Balapan, Semipalatinsk, Kazakhstan: 1206 49.95389°N 78.87389°E | 330 m (1,080 ft) + | underground shaft, weapons development | | 36 kt | | | |
| 434 | 13 December 1975 04:56:59.99 | ALMT (6 hrs) | Degelen, Semipalatinsk, Kazakhstan: 604 49.8076°N 78.1144°E | 770 m (2,530 ft) + | tunnel, weapons development | | 8 kt | | | |
| 435 | 25 December 1975 05:16:59.67 | ALMT (6 hrs) | Balapan, Semipalatinsk, Kazakhstan: 1067 50.04884°N 78.81882°E | 330 m (1,080 ft) + | underground shaft, weapons development | | 59 kt | | | |
