= 1981 Soviet nuclear tests =

1981

Information
- Country: Soviet Union
- Test site: Astrakhan, Russia; Balapan, Semipalatinsk, Kazakhstan; Degelen, Semipalatinsk, Kazakhstan; Krasnoyarsk, Russia; Nenetsky, Russia; NZ Area B, Matochkin Shar, Novaya Zemlya, Russia; Perm, Russia
- Period: 1981
- Number of tests: 21
- Test type: underground shaft, tunnel
- Max. yield: 150 kilotonnes of TNT (630 TJ)

Test series chronology

The Soviet Union's 1981 nuclear test series was a group of 21 nuclear tests conducted in 1981. These tests (Note: A bomb test may be a salvo test, defined as two or more explosions "where a period of time between successive individual explosions does not exceed 5 seconds and where the burial points of all explosive devices can be connected by segments of straight lines, each of them connecting two burial points and does not exceed 40 kilometers in length". Mikhailov, V. N. "Catalog of World Wide Nuclear Testing". Begell-Atom, LLC. Archived from the original on 2014-04-26.) followed the 1980 Soviet nuclear tests series and preceded the 1982 Soviet nuclear tests series.

Soviet Union's 1981 series tests and detonations
Name (Note: The US, France and Great Britain have code-named their test events, while the USSR and China did not, and therefore have only test numbers (with some exceptions – Soviet peaceful explosions were named). Word translations into English in parentheses unless the name is a proper noun. A dash followed by a number indicates a member of a salvo event. The US also sometimes named the individual explosions in such a salvo test, which results in "name1 – 1(with name2)". If test is canceled or aborted, then the row data like date and location discloses the intended plans, where known.)	Date time (UT)	Local time zone (Note: To convert the UT time into standard local, add the number of hours in parentheses to the UT time; for local daylight saving time, add one additional hour. If the result is earlier than 00:00, add 24 hours and subtract 1 from the day; if it is 24:00 or later, subtract 24 hours and add 1 to the day. Historical time zone data obtained from the IANA time zone database.)	Location (Note: Rough place name and a latitude/longitude reference; for rocket-carried tests, the launch location is specified before the detonation location, if known. Some locations are extremely accurate; others (like airdrops and space blasts) may be quite inaccurate. "~" indicates a likely pro-forma rough location, shared with other tests in that same area.)	Elevation + height (Note: Elevation is the ground level at the point directly below the explosion relative to sea level; height is the additional distance added or subtracted by tower, balloon, shaft, tunnel, air drop or other contrivance. For rocket bursts the ground level is "N/A". In some cases it is not clear if the height is absolute or relative to ground, for example, Plumbbob/John. No number or units indicates the value is unknown, while "0" means zero. Sorting on this column is by elevation and height added together.)	Delivery, (Note: Atmospheric, airdrop, balloon, gun, cruise missile, rocket, surface, tower, and barge are all disallowed by the Partial Nuclear Test Ban Treaty. Sealed shaft and tunnel are underground, and remained useful under the PTBT. Intentional cratering tests are borderline; they occurred under the treaty, were sometimes protested, and generally overlooked if the test was declared to be a peaceful use.) Purpose (Note: Include weapons development, weapon effects, safety test, transport safety test, war, science, joint verification and industrial/peaceful, which may be further broken down.)	Device (Note: Designations for test items where known, "?" indicates some uncertainty about the preceding value, nicknames for particular devices in quotes. This category of information is often not officially disclosed.)	Yield (Note: Estimated energy yield in tons, kilotons, and megatons. A ton of TNT equivalent is defined as 4.184 gigajoules (1 gigacalorie).)	Fallout (Note: Radioactive emission to the atmosphere aside from prompt neutrons, where known. The measured species is only iodine-131 if mentioned, otherwise it is all species. No entry means unknown, probably none if underground and "all" if not; otherwise notation for whether measured on the site only or off the site, where known, and the measured amount of radioactivity released.)	References	Notes
567	25 March 1981	ALMT (6 hrs)	Degelen, Semipalatinsk, Kazakhstan: 603-pp 49.81806°N 78.04053°E	677 m (2,221 ft) +	tunnel, safety experiment		1000 kg			
568 - 1	29 March 1981 04:03:52.58	ALMT (6 hrs)	Balapan, Semipalatinsk, Kazakhstan: 1234 50.02305°N 78.97872°E	330 m (1,080 ft) +	underground shaft, weapons development		30 kt			
568 - 2	29 March 1981 04:03:52.6	ALMT (6 hrs)	Balapan, Semipalatinsk, Kazakhstan: 1234 50.02305°N 78.97872°E	330 m (1,080 ft) +	underground shaft, fundamental science		unknown yield			
568 - 3	29 March 1981 04:03:52.6	ALMT (6 hrs)	Balapan, Semipalatinsk, Kazakhstan: 1234 50.02305°N 78.97872°E	330 m (1,080 ft) +	underground shaft, fundamental science		unknown yield			
569 - 1	22 April 1981 01:17:13.91	ALMT (6 hrs)	Balapan, Semipalatinsk, Kazakhstan: 1232 49.89986°N 78.80613°E	330 m (1,080 ft) +	underground shaft, weapons development		92 kt			
569 - 2	22 April 1981 01:17:13.9	ALMT (6 hrs)	Balapan, Semipalatinsk, Kazakhstan: 1232 49.89986°N 78.80613°E	330 m (1,080 ft) +	underground shaft, weapons development		unknown yield			
569 - 3	22 April 1981 01:17:13.9	ALMT (6 hrs)	Balapan, Semipalatinsk, Kazakhstan: 1232 49.89986°N 78.80613°E	330 m (1,080 ft) +	underground shaft, weapons development		unknown yield			
570 Pirit (Pyrite)	25 May 1981 05:00:00.3	KRAT (7 hrs)	Nenetsky, Russia 67.95265°N 53.96737°E	– 1,511 m (4,957 ft)	underground shaft, extinguishing oil/gas fires		37.6 kt			Gas fire shaft closure.
571	27 May 1981 03:58:14.88	ALMT (6 hrs)	Balapan, Semipalatinsk, Kazakhstan: 1203 49.9887°N 78.96913°E	330 m (1,080 ft) +	underground shaft, weapons development		20 kt			
572	4 June 1981	ALMT (6 hrs)	Degelen, Semipalatinsk, Kazakhstan: 603-pp 49.81902°N 78.04075°E	677 m (2,221 ft) +	tunnel, safety experiment		1000 kg			
573 - 1	30 June 1981 01:57:15.34	ALMT (6 hrs)	Degelen, Semipalatinsk, Kazakhstan: 187 49.7669°N 78.0744°E	633 m (2,077 ft) +	tunnel, weapons development		12 kt			
573 - 2	30 June 1981 01:57:15.3	ALMT (6 hrs)	Degelen, Semipalatinsk, Kazakhstan: 187 49.7669°N 78.0744°E	633 m (2,077 ft) +	tunnel, weapons development		unknown yield			
574	17 July 1981 02:37:18.12	ALMT (6 hrs)	Degelen, Semipalatinsk, Kazakhstan: 106 49.8064°N 78.1352°E	802 m (2,631 ft) – 146 m (479 ft)	tunnel, weapons development		9.3 kt			
575 - 1	14 August 1981 02:27:15.24	ALMT (6 hrs)	Degelen, Semipalatinsk, Kazakhstan: 184 49.7587°N 78.0565°E	717 m (2,352 ft) +	tunnel, weapons development		5.6 kt			
575 - 2	14 August 1981 02:27:15.2	ALMT (6 hrs)	Degelen, Semipalatinsk, Kazakhstan: 184 49.7587°N 78.0565°E	717 m (2,352 ft) +	tunnel, weapons development		unknown yield			
575 - 3	14 August 1981 02:27:15.2	ALMT (6 hrs)	Degelen, Semipalatinsk, Kazakhstan: 184 49.7587°N 78.0565°E	717 m (2,352 ft) +	tunnel, weapons development		unknown yield			
576 Geliy 1 (Helium)	2 September 1981 04:00:00.0	SVET (5 hrs)	Perm, Russia: 401 60.6°N 55.7°E	– 2,090 m (6,860 ft)	underground shaft, oil stimulation		3.2 kt			Oil recovery intensification.170 km NE Bereznyaki.
577	13 September 1981 02:17:20.84	ALMT (6 hrs)	Balapan, Semipalatinsk, Kazakhstan: 1233 49.91478°N 78.89416°E	330 m (1,080 ft) +	underground shaft, weapons development		150 kt			
578 Vega 4T	26 September 1981 05:00:00.3	VOLT (4 hrs)	Astrakhan, Russia: 4T/2 46.79357°N 48.30856°E	10 m (33 ft) – 1,050 m (3,440 ft)	underground shaft, cavity excavation		8.5 kt			Create reservoirs for gas storage. 35 km N Astrakhan.
579 Vega 2T	26 September 1981 05:03:59.9	VOLT (4 hrs)	Astrakhan, Russia: 2T/2 46.77591°N 48.30111°E	10 m (33 ft) – 1,050 m (3,440 ft)	underground shaft, cavity excavation		8.5 kt			Create reservoirs for gas storage. 35 km N Astrakhan.
580 - 1	1 October 1981 12:14:57.23	MSK (3 hrs)	NZ Area B, Matochkin Shar, Novaya Zemlya, Russia: A-23 73.304°N 54.818°E	100 m (330 ft) – 600 m (2,000 ft)	tunnel, weapons development		140 kt			
580 - 2	1 October 1981 12:14:57.2	MSK (3 hrs)	NZ Area B, Matochkin Shar, Novaya Zemlya, Russia: A-23 73.304°N 54.818°E	100 m (330 ft) +	tunnel, weapons development		unknown yield			
580 - 3	1 October 1981 12:14:57.2	MSK (3 hrs)	NZ Area B, Matochkin Shar, Novaya Zemlya, Russia: A-23 73.304°N 54.818°E	100 m (330 ft) +	tunnel, weapons development		unknown yield			
580 - 4	1 October 1981 12:14:57.2	MSK (3 hrs)	NZ Area B, Matochkin Shar, Novaya Zemlya, Russia: A-23 73.304°N 54.818°E	100 m (330 ft) +	tunnel, weapons development		unknown yield			
581	16 October 1981	ALMT (6 hrs)	Degelen, Semipalatinsk, Kazakhstan: 136-pp 49.82982°N 78.08045°E	638 m (2,093 ft) +	tunnel, safety experiment		1000 kg			
582 - 1	18 October 1981 03:57:05.22	ALMT (6 hrs)	Balapan, Semipalatinsk, Kazakhstan: 1236 49.92896°N 78.84349°E	330 m (1,080 ft) +	underground shaft, weapons development		107 kt			
582 - 2	18 October 1981 03:57:05.2	ALMT (6 hrs)	Balapan, Semipalatinsk, Kazakhstan: 1236 49.92896°N 78.84349°E	330 m (1,080 ft) +	underground shaft, weapons development		unknown yield			
583 Shpat 2 (Spar)	22 October 1981 14:00:00.4	KRAT (7 hrs)	Krasnoyarsk, Russia: ShP-2 63.80332°N 97.53177°E	– 580 m (1,900 ft)	underground shaft, seismic sounding		8.5 kt			Gas extraction intensification. 140 km W Tura, Krasnoyarsk.
584 - 1	20 November 1981 04:57:05.07	ALMT (6 hrs)	Degelen, Semipalatinsk, Kazakhstan: 103 49.7401°N 78.0965°E	620 m (2,030 ft) +	tunnel, weapons development		8 kt			
584 - 2	20 November 1981 04:57:05.1	ALMT (6 hrs)	Degelen, Semipalatinsk, Kazakhstan: 103 49.7401°N 78.0965°E	620 m (2,030 ft) +	tunnel, weapons development		unknown yield			
585 - 1	29 November 1981 03:35:11.2	ALMT (6 hrs)	Balapan, Semipalatinsk, Kazakhstan: 1237 49.90269°N 78.84754°E	330 m (1,080 ft) +	underground shaft, weapons development		31 kt			
585 - 2	29 November 1981 03:35:11.2	ALMT (6 hrs)	Balapan, Semipalatinsk, Kazakhstan: 1237 49.90269°N 78.84754°E	330 m (1,080 ft) +	underground shaft, weapons development		unknown yield			
585 - 3	29 November 1981 03:35:11.2	ALMT (6 hrs)	Balapan, Semipalatinsk, Kazakhstan: 1237 49.90269°N 78.84754°E	330 m (1,080 ft) +	underground shaft, weapons development		unknown yield			
586 - 1	22 December 1981 04:31:05.27	ALMT (6 hrs)	Degelen, Semipalatinsk, Kazakhstan: 135 49.8267°N 78.0757°E	638 m (2,093 ft) +	tunnel, weapons development		7 kt			
586 - 2	22 December 1981 04:31:05.3	ALMT (6 hrs)	Degelen, Semipalatinsk, Kazakhstan: 135 49.8267°N 78.0757°E	638 m (2,093 ft) +	tunnel, weapons development		unknown yield			
586 - 3	22 December 1981 04:31:05.3	ALMT (6 hrs)	Degelen, Semipalatinsk, Kazakhstan: 135 49.8267°N 78.0757°E	638 m (2,093 ft) +	tunnel, weapons development		unknown yield			
587	27 December 1981 03:43:16.72	ALMT (6 hrs)	Balapan, Semipalatinsk, Kazakhstan: 1312 49.93144°N 78.7862°E	330 m (1,080 ft) +	underground shaft, weapons development		150 kt			
