= 1985 Soviet nuclear tests =

1985

Information
- Country: Soviet Union
- Test site: Arkhangelsk, Russia; Balapan, Semipalatinsk, Kazakhstan; Degelen, Semipalatinsk, Kazakhstan; Khanty-Mansi, Russia
- Period: 1985
- Number of tests: 10
- Test type: underground shaft, tunnel
- Max. yield: 114 kilotonnes of TNT (480 TJ)

Test series chronology

The Soviet Union's 1985 nuclear test series was a group of 10 nuclear tests conducted in 1985. These tests (Note: A bomb test may be a salvo test, defined as two or more explosions "where a period of time between successive individual explosions does not exceed 5 seconds and where the burial points of all explosive devices can be connected by segments of straight lines, each of them connecting two burial points and does not exceed 40 kilometers in length". Mikhailov, V. N. "Catalog of World Wide Nuclear Testing". Begell-Atom, LLC. Archived from the original on 2014-04-26.) followed the 1984 Soviet nuclear tests series and preceded the 1987 Soviet nuclear tests series.

Soviet Union's 1985 series tests and detonations
Name (Note: The US, France and Great Britain have code-named their test events, while the USSR and China did not, and therefore have only test numbers (with some exceptions – Soviet peaceful explosions were named). Word translations into English in parentheses unless the name is a proper noun. A dash followed by a number indicates a member of a salvo event. The US also sometimes named the individual explosions in such a salvo test, which results in "name1 – 1(with name2)". If test is canceled or aborted, then the row data like date and location discloses the intended plans, where known.)	Date time (UT)	Local time zone (Note: To convert the UT time into standard local, add the number of hours in parentheses to the UT time; for local daylight saving time, add one additional hour. If the result is earlier than 00:00, add 24 hours and subtract 1 from the day; if it is 24:00 or later, subtract 24 hours and add 1 to the day. Historical time zone data obtained from the IANA time zone database.)	Location (Note: Rough place name and a latitude/longitude reference; for rocket-carried tests, the launch location is specified before the detonation location, if known. Some locations are extremely accurate; others (like airdrops and space blasts) may be quite inaccurate. "~" indicates a likely pro-forma rough location, shared with other tests in that same area.)	Elevation + height (Note: Elevation is the ground level at the point directly below the explosion relative to sea level; height is the additional distance added or subtracted by tower, balloon, shaft, tunnel, air drop or other contrivance. For rocket bursts the ground level is "N/A". In some cases it is not clear if the height is absolute or relative to ground, for example, Plumbbob/John. No number or units indicates the value is unknown, while "0" means zero. Sorting on this column is by elevation and height added together.)	Delivery, (Note: Atmospheric, airdrop, balloon, gun, cruise missile, rocket, surface, tower, and barge are all disallowed by the Partial Nuclear Test Ban Treaty. Sealed shaft and tunnel are underground, and remained useful under the PTBT. Intentional cratering tests are borderline; they occurred under the treaty, were sometimes protested, and generally overlooked if the test was declared to be a peaceful use.) Purpose (Note: Include weapons development, weapon effects, safety test, transport safety test, war, science, joint verification and industrial/peaceful, which may be further broken down.)	Device (Note: Designations for test items where known, "?" indicates some uncertainty about the preceding value, nicknames for particular devices in quotes. This category of information is often not officially disclosed.)	Yield (Note: Estimated energy yield in tons, kilotons, and megatons. A ton of TNT equivalent is defined as 4.184 gigajoules (1 gigacalorie).)	Fallout (Note: Radioactive emission to the atmosphere aside from prompt neutrons, where known. The measured species is only iodine-131 if mentioned, otherwise it is all species. No entry means unknown, probably none if underground and "all" if not; otherwise notation for whether measured on the site only or off the site, where known, and the measured amount of radioactivity released.)	References	Notes
659 - 1	10 February 1985 03:27:10.07	ALMT (6 hrs)	Balapan, Semipalatinsk, Kazakhstan: 1340 49.89917°N 78.77939°E	330 m (1,080 ft) +	underground shaft, weapons development		62 kt			
659 - 2	10 February 1985 03:27:10.1	ALMT (6 hrs)	Balapan, Semipalatinsk, Kazakhstan: 1340 49.89917°N 78.77939°E	330 m (1,080 ft) +	underground shaft, weapons development		unknown yield			
659 - 3	10 February 1985 03:27:10.1	ALMT (6 hrs)	Balapan, Semipalatinsk, Kazakhstan: 1340 49.89917°N 78.77939°E	330 m (1,080 ft) +	underground shaft, weapons development		unknown yield			
660 - 1	25 April 1985 00:57:09.1	ALMT (6 hrs)	Balapan, Semipalatinsk, Kazakhstan: 1319 49.92667°N 78.88083°E	330 m (1,080 ft) +	underground shaft, weapons development		74 kt			
660 - 2	25 April 1985 00:57:09.1	ALMT (6 hrs)	Balapan, Semipalatinsk, Kazakhstan: 1319 49.92667°N 78.88083°E	330 m (1,080 ft) +	underground shaft, weapons development		unknown yield			
661 - 1	15 June 1985 00:57:03.21	ALMT (6 hrs)	Balapan, Semipalatinsk, Kazakhstan: 1341 49.90829°N 78.83869°E	330 m (1,080 ft) +	underground shaft, weapons development		114 kt			
661 - 2	15 June 1985 00:57:03.2	ALMT (6 hrs)	Balapan, Semipalatinsk, Kazakhstan: 1341 49.90829°N 78.83869°E	330 m (1,080 ft) +	underground shaft, weapons development		unknown yield			
661 - 3	15 June 1985 00:57:03	ALMT (6 hrs)	Balapan, Semipalatinsk, Kazakhstan: 1061bis 49.92084°N 78.8196°E	330 m (1,080 ft) +	underground shaft, weapons development		unknown yield			
662 Benzol (Benzine)	18 June 1985 04:00:00.1	SVET (5 hrs)	Khanty-Mansi, Russia 60.6°N 72.7°E	– 2,860 m (9,380 ft)	underground shaft, oil stimulation		2.5 kt			Oil recovery intensification. 110 km SW Surgur.
663 - 1	30 June 1985 02:39:05.13	ALMT (6 hrs)	Balapan, Semipalatinsk, Kazakhstan: 1354 49.86438°N 78.66744°E	330 m (1,080 ft) +	underground shaft, weapons development		86 kt			
663 - 2	30 June 1985 02:39:05.1	ALMT (6 hrs)	Balapan, Semipalatinsk, Kazakhstan: 1354 49.86438°N 78.66744°E	330 m (1,080 ft) +	underground shaft, weapons development		unknown yield			
664	11 July 1985 02:57:02.0	ALMT (6 hrs)	Degelen, Semipalatinsk, Kazakhstan: 175-pp 49.75024°N 78.04326°E	682 m (2,238 ft) +	tunnel, weapons development		500 t			
666 Agat (Kvartz 1)	18 July 1985 21:15:00.3	MSK (3 hrs)	Arkhangelsk, Russia 65.994°N 41.038°E	– 770 m (2,530 ft)	underground shaft, seismic sounding		8.5 kt			Seismic probing program. 150 km W Mizen.
665	19 July 1985 04:00:08.0	ALMT (6 hrs)	Degelen, Semipalatinsk, Kazakhstan: 901 49.80325°N 78.06276°E	710 m (2,330 ft) +	tunnel, weapons development		unknown yield			
667	20 July 1985 00:53:16.98	ALMT (6 hrs)	Balapan, Semipalatinsk, Kazakhstan: 1322 49.94972°N 78.78389°E	330 m (1,080 ft) +	underground shaft, weapons development		74 kt			
668 - 1	25 July 1985 03:11:09.23	ALMT (6 hrs)	Degelen, Semipalatinsk, Kazakhstan: 152 49.8157°N 78.0096°E	654 m (2,146 ft) +	tunnel, weapons development		5 kt			
668 - 2	25 July 1985 03:11:09.1	ALMT (6 hrs)	Degelen, Semipalatinsk, Kazakhstan: 152 49.8157°N 78.0096°E	654 m (2,146 ft) +	tunnel, weapons development		unknown yield			
668 - 3	25 July 1985 03:11:09.1	ALMT (6 hrs)	Degelen, Semipalatinsk, Kazakhstan: 152 49.8157°N 78.0096°E	654 m (2,146 ft) +	tunnel, safety experiment		unknown yield			
668 - 4	25 July 1985 03:11:09.1	ALMT (6 hrs)	Degelen, Semipalatinsk, Kazakhstan: 152 49.8157°N 78.0096°E	654 m (2,146 ft) +	tunnel, safety experiment		unknown yield			
