= 1979 Soviet nuclear tests =

1979
- Nuclear blast animation

Information
- Country: Soviet Union
- Test site: Atyrau, Kazakhstan; Balapan, Semipalatinsk, Kazakhstan; Degelen, Semipalatinsk, Kazakhstan; Donetsk, Ukraine; Khanty-Mansi, Russia; Krasnoyarsk, Russia; NZ Area B, Matochkin Shar, Novaya Zemlya, Russia; Sakha, Russia; Sary-Uzen/Murzhik, Semipalatinsk, Kazakhstan
- Period: 1979
- Number of tests: 31
- Test type: underground shaft, tunnel
- Max. yield: 150 kilotonnes of TNT (630 TJ)

Test series chronology

The Soviet Union's 1979 nuclear test series was a group of 31 nuclear tests conducted in 1979. These tests (Note: A bomb test may be a salvo test, defined as two or more explosions "where a period of time between successive individual explosions does not exceed 5 seconds and where the burial points of all explosive devices can be connected by segments of straight lines, each of them connecting two burial points and does not exceed 40 kilometers in length". Mikhailov, V. N. "Catalog of World Wide Nuclear Testing". Begell-Atom, LLC. Archived from the original on 2014-04-26.) followed the 1978 Soviet nuclear tests series and preceded the 1980 Soviet nuclear tests series.

Soviet Union's 1979 series tests and detonations
Name (Note: The US, France and Great Britain have code-named their test events, while the USSR and China did not, and therefore have only test numbers (with some exceptions – Soviet peaceful explosions were named). Word translations into English in parentheses unless the name is a proper noun. A dash followed by a number indicates a member of a salvo event. The US also sometimes named the individual explosions in such a salvo test, which results in "name1 – 1(with name2)". If test is canceled or aborted, then the row data like date and location discloses the intended plans, where known.)	Date time (UT)	Local time zone (Note: To convert the UT time into standard local, add the number of hours in parentheses to the UT time; for local daylight saving time, add one additional hour. If the result is earlier than 00:00, add 24 hours and subtract 1 from the day; if it is 24:00 or later, subtract 24 hours and add 1 to the day. Historical time zone data obtained from the IANA time zone database.)	Location (Note: Rough place name and a latitude/longitude reference; for rocket-carried tests, the launch location is specified before the detonation location, if known. Some locations are extremely accurate; others (like airdrops and space blasts) may be quite inaccurate. "~" indicates a likely pro-forma rough location, shared with other tests in that same area.)	Elevation + height (Note: Elevation is the ground level at the point directly below the explosion relative to sea level; height is the additional distance added or subtracted by tower, balloon, shaft, tunnel, air drop or other contrivance. For rocket bursts the ground level is "N/A". In some cases it is not clear if the height is absolute or relative to ground, for example, Plumbbob/John. No number or units indicates the value is unknown, while "0" means zero. Sorting on this column is by elevation and height added together.)	Delivery, (Note: Atmospheric, airdrop, balloon, gun, cruise missile, rocket, surface, tower, and barge are all disallowed by the Partial Nuclear Test Ban Treaty. Sealed shaft and tunnel are underground, and remained useful under the PTBT. Intentional cratering tests are borderline; they occurred under the treaty, were sometimes protested, and generally overlooked if the test was declared to be a peaceful use.) Purpose (Note: Include weapons development, weapon effects, safety test, transport safety test, war, science, joint verification and industrial/peaceful, which may be further broken down.)	Device (Note: Designations for test items where known, "?" indicates some uncertainty about the preceding value, nicknames for particular devices in quotes. This category of information is often not officially disclosed.)	Yield (Note: Estimated energy yield in tons, kilotons, and megatons. A ton of TNT equivalent is defined as 4.184 gigajoules (1 gigacalorie).)	Fallout (Note: Radioactive emission to the atmosphere aside from prompt neutrons, where known. The measured species is only iodine-131 if mentioned, otherwise it is all species. No entry means unknown, probably none if underground and "all" if not; otherwise notation for whether measured on the site only or off the site, where known, and the measured amount of radioactivity released.)	References	Notes
512 Galit A2.6 (Halite)	10 January 1979 08:00:00.0	SHET (5 hrs)	Atyrau, Kazakhstan: A-II-7 47.909°N 47.912°E	– 600 m (2,000 ft)	underground shaft, cavity excavation		500 t			Create reservoirs for gas storage. A fizzle.
513 Galit A8 (Halite) - 1	17 January 1979 07:59:58.5	SHET (5 hrs)	Atyrau, Kazakhstan: A-VIII 47.91873°N 48.12376°E	– 1,000 m (3,300 ft)	underground shaft, cavity excavation		12 kt	Venting detected		Create reservoirs for gas storage.
513 Galit A8 (Halite) - 2	17 January 1979 07:59:58.5	SHET (5 hrs)	Atyrau, Kazakhstan: A-VIII 47.91873°N 48.12376°E	+	underground shaft, cavity excavation		56 kt	Venting detected		Create reservoirs for gas storage.
514	1 February 1979 04:13:00.17	ALMT (6 hrs)	Balapan, Semipalatinsk, Kazakhstan: 1006 50.08586°N 78.85137°E	330 m (1,080 ft) +	underground shaft, weapons development		18 kt			
515 - 1	16 February 1979 04:04:00.5	ALMT (6 hrs)	Sary-Uzen/Murzhik, Semipalatinsk, Kazakhstan: 109 49.96553°N 77.67082°E	460 m (1,510 ft) +	underground shaft, weapons development		23 kt			
515 - 2	16 February 1979 04:04:01	ALMT (6 hrs)	Sary-Uzen/Murzhik, Semipalatinsk, Kazakhstan: 2803 49.96553°N 77.67082°E	460 m (1,510 ft) +	underground shaft, weapons development		unknown yield			
516	23 March 1979	ALMT (6 hrs)	Degelen, Semipalatinsk, Kazakhstan: 115p 49.81173°N 78.15933°E	602 m (1,975 ft) +	tunnel, safety experiment		1000 kg			
517	10 April 1979	ALMT (6 hrs)	Degelen, Semipalatinsk, Kazakhstan: 115p 49.81131°N 78.16243°E	602 m (1,975 ft) +	tunnel, safety experiment		1000 kg			
518 - 1	6 May 1979 03:17:00.07	ALMT (6 hrs)	Degelen, Semipalatinsk, Kazakhstan: 701p 49.7643°N 77.9993°E	704 m (2,310 ft) +	tunnel, weapons development		15 kt			
518 - 2	6 May 1979 03:17:00.1	ALMT (6 hrs)	Degelen, Semipalatinsk, Kazakhstan: 701p 49.7643°N 77.9993°E	704 m (2,310 ft) +	tunnel, weapons development		unknown yield			
519 - 1	31 May 1979 05:55:00.05	ALMT (6 hrs)	Degelen, Semipalatinsk, Kazakhstan: 141 49.81765°N 78.06755°E	745 m (2,444 ft) +	tunnel, weapons development		17 kt			
519 - 2	31 May 1979 05:55:00.1	ALMT (6 hrs)	Degelen, Semipalatinsk, Kazakhstan: 141 49.81765°N 78.06755°E	745 m (2,444 ft) +	tunnel, weapons development		unknown yield			
519 - 3	31 May 1979 05:55:00.1	ALMT (6 hrs)	Degelen, Semipalatinsk, Kazakhstan: 141 49.81765°N 78.06755°E	745 m (2,444 ft) +	tunnel, weapons development		unknown yield			
519 - 4	31 May 1979 05:55:00	ALMT (6 hrs)	Degelen, Semipalatinsk, Kazakhstan: 136p 49.82679°N 78.06854°E	638 m (2,093 ft) +	tunnel, weapons development		unknown yield			
520	12 June 1979	ALMT (6 hrs)	Degelen, Semipalatinsk, Kazakhstan: 115-ppp 49.81091°N 78.16508°E	602 m (1,975 ft) +	tunnel, safety experiment		1000 kg			
521	23 June 1979 02:57:00.11	ALMT (6 hrs)	Balapan, Semipalatinsk, Kazakhstan: 1223 49.91608°N 78.84455°E	330 m (1,080 ft) +	underground shaft, weapons development		149 kt			
522 - 1	7 July 1979 03:46:59.87	ALMT (6 hrs)	Balapan, Semipalatinsk, Kazakhstan: 1225 50.04°N 78.98957°E	330 m (1,080 ft) +	underground shaft, weapons development		97 kt			
522 - 2	7 July 1979 03:46:59.9	ALMT (6 hrs)	Balapan, Semipalatinsk, Kazakhstan: 1225 50.04°N 78.98957°E	330 m (1,080 ft) +	underground shaft, weapons development		unknown yield			
523 Galit A11 (Halite) - 1	14 July 1979 04:59:58.0	SHET (5 hrs)	Atyrau, Kazakhstan: A-XI 47.88195°N 48.12012°E	– 980 m (3,220 ft)	underground shaft, cavity excavation		7 kt			Create reservoirs for gas storage.
523 Galit A11 (Halite) - 2	14 July 1979 04:59:58.0	SHET (5 hrs)	Atyrau, Kazakhstan: A-XI 47.88195°N 48.12012°E	+	underground shaft, cavity excavation		7 kt			Create reservoirs for gas storage.
523 Galit A11 (Halite) - 3	14 July 1979 04:59:58.0	SHET (5 hrs)	Atyrau, Kazakhstan: A-XI 47.88195°N 48.12012°E	+	underground shaft, cavity excavation		7 kt			Create reservoirs for gas storage.
524	18 July 1979 03:17:04.92	ALMT (6 hrs)	Sary-Uzen/Murzhik, Semipalatinsk, Kazakhstan: 2613 49.92057°N 77.81339°E	460 m (1,510 ft) +	underground shaft, weapons development		12 kt			
525	18 July 1979 03:17:04.9	ALMT (6 hrs)	Degelen, Semipalatinsk, Kazakhstan: 195p 49.7791°N 78.1027°E	600 m (2,000 ft) +	tunnel, fundamental science		14 kt			
526 - 1	4 August 1979 03:56:59.67	ALMT (6 hrs)	Balapan, Semipalatinsk, Kazakhstan: 1085 49.90467°N 78.88634°E	330 m (1,080 ft) +	underground shaft, weapons development		150 kt			
526 - 2	4 August 1979 03:56:59.7	ALMT (6 hrs)	Balapan, Semipalatinsk, Kazakhstan: 1085 49.90467°N 78.88634°E	330 m (1,080 ft) +	underground shaft, weapons development		unknown yield			
527 Kimberlit 4 (Kimberlite)	12 August 1979 18:00:00.2	YAKT (9 hrs)	Sakha, Russia: KM-4 61.803°N 122.43°E	– 980 m (3,220 ft)	underground shaft, seismic sounding		8.5 kt			Seismic probing program.
528 - 1	18 August 1979 02:51:59.71	ALMT (6 hrs)	Balapan, Semipalatinsk, Kazakhstan: 1226 49.9485°N 78.9185°E	330 m (1,080 ft) +	underground shaft, weapons development		150 kt			
528 - 2	18 August 1979 02:51:59.7	ALMT (6 hrs)	Balapan, Semipalatinsk, Kazakhstan: 1226 49.9485°N 78.9185°E	330 m (1,080 ft) +	underground shaft, weapons development		unknown yield			
529 Kimberlit 3 (Kimberlite)	6 September 1979 18:00:00.3	KRAT (7 hrs)	Krasnoyarsk, Russia: KM-3 64.11°N 99.562°E	– 600 m (2,000 ft)	underground shaft, seismic sounding		8.5 kt			Seismic probing program. 35 km SW Tura, Krasnoyarsk.
530 Klivazh (Cleavage)	16 September 1979 09:00:00.0	MSK (3 hrs)	Donetsk, Ukraine: Yunkom coal mine 48.21336°N 38.28162°E	– 900 m (3,000 ft)	tunnel, industrial, free methane gas, to lower danger of explosion		300 t			The mine resumed normal operations the following day
531 - 1	24 September 1979 03:29:58.75	MSK (3 hrs)	NZ Area B, Matochkin Shar, Novaya Zemlya, Russia: A-32 73.343°N 54.672°E	100 m (330 ft) – 500 m (1,600 ft)	tunnel, weapons development		130 kt	Venting detected on site, 170 Ci (6,300 GBq)		
531 - 2	24 September 1979 03:29:58.8	MSK (3 hrs)	NZ Area B, Matochkin Shar, Novaya Zemlya, Russia: A-32 73.343°N 54.672°E	100 m (330 ft) +	tunnel, weapons development		unknown yield			
531 - 3	24 September 1979 03:29:58.8	MSK (3 hrs)	NZ Area B, Matochkin Shar, Novaya Zemlya, Russia: A-32 73.343°N 54.672°E	100 m (330 ft) +	tunnel, weapons development		unknown yield			
532	27 September 1979 04:13:00.0	ALMT (6 hrs)	Degelen, Semipalatinsk, Kazakhstan: 175p 49.75°N 78.0399°E	682 m (2,238 ft) +	tunnel, weapon effect		1.6 kt			
533 Kimberlit 1 (Kimberlite)	4 October 1979 16:00:00.0	SVET (5 hrs)	Khanty-Mansi, Russia: KM-1 60.675°N 71.455°E	– 840 m (2,760 ft)	underground shaft, seismic sounding		22 kt			Seismic probing program. 122 km SW Surgut.
534 Sheksna (Neva)	7 October 1979 21:00:00.2	YAKT (9 hrs)	Sakha, Russia: 47 61.85°N 113.1°E	– 1,550 m (5,090 ft)	underground shaft, oil stimulation		15 kt			Oil recovery intensification.
535 - 1	18 October 1979 04:17:00.11	ALMT (6 hrs)	Degelen, Semipalatinsk, Kazakhstan: 128 49.82°N 78.1003°E	659 m (2,162 ft) +	tunnel, weapons development		15 kt			
535 - 2	18 October 1979 04:17:00.1	ALMT (6 hrs)	Degelen, Semipalatinsk, Kazakhstan: 128 49.82°N 78.1003°E	659 m (2,162 ft) +	tunnel, weapons development		unknown yield			
536 - 1	18 October 1979 07:09:58.75	MSK (3 hrs)	NZ Area B, Matochkin Shar, Novaya Zemlya, Russia: A-20 73.316°N 54.816°E	100 m (330 ft) – 500 m (1,600 ft)	tunnel, weapons development		150 kt	Venting detected on site, 40 Ci (1,500 GBq)		
536 - 2	18 October 1979 07:09:58.8	MSK (3 hrs)	NZ Area B, Matochkin Shar, Novaya Zemlya, Russia: A-20 73.316°N 54.816°E	100 m (330 ft) +	tunnel, weapons development		unknown yield			
536 - 3	18 October 1979 07:09:58.8	MSK (3 hrs)	NZ Area B, Matochkin Shar, Novaya Zemlya, Russia: A-20 73.316°N 54.816°E	100 m (330 ft) +	tunnel, weapons development		unknown yield			
536 - 4	18 October 1979 07:09:58.8	MSK (3 hrs)	NZ Area B, Matochkin Shar, Novaya Zemlya, Russia: A-20 73.316°N 54.816°E	100 m (330 ft) +	tunnel, weapons development		unknown yield			
537 Galit A10 (Halite) - 1	24 October 1979 05:59:59.0	SHET (5 hrs)	Atyrau, Kazakhstan: A-X 47.85243°N 48.14327°E	– 850 m (2,790 ft)	underground shaft, cavity excavation		3 kt			Create reservoirs for gas storage.
537 Galit A10 (Halite) - 2	24 October 1979 05:59:59.0	SHET (5 hrs)	Atyrau, Kazakhstan: A-X 47.85243°N 48.14327°E	+	underground shaft, cavity excavation		30 kt			
538 - 1	28 October 1979 03:16:59.55	ALMT (6 hrs)	Balapan, Semipalatinsk, Kazakhstan: 1224 49.99759°N 78.9945°E	330 m (1,080 ft) +	underground shaft, weapons development		120 kt			
538 - 2	28 October 1979 03:16:59.6	ALMT (6 hrs)	Balapan, Semipalatinsk, Kazakhstan: 1224 49.99759°N 78.9945°E	330 m (1,080 ft) +	underground shaft, weapons development		unknown yield			
539	30 November 1979 04:53:00.58	ALMT (6 hrs)	Degelen, Semipalatinsk, Kazakhstan: 192p 49.7794°N 78.0953°E	635 m (2,083 ft) +	tunnel, weapons development		1.6 kt			
540 - 1	2 December 1979 04:37:00.06	ALMT (6 hrs)	Balapan, Semipalatinsk, Kazakhstan: 1309 49.91024°N 78.78456°E	330 m (1,080 ft) +	underground shaft, weapons development		93 kt			
540 - 2	2 December 1979 04:37:00.1	ALMT (6 hrs)	Balapan, Semipalatinsk, Kazakhstan: 1309 49.91024°N 78.78456°E	330 m (1,080 ft) +	underground shaft, fundamental science		unknown yield			
541	21 December 1979 04:42:00.09	ALMT (6 hrs)	Degelen, Semipalatinsk, Kazakhstan: 802p 49.7957°N 78.123°E	727 m (2,385 ft) +	tunnel, weapons development		3.6 kt			
542 - 1	23 December 1979 04:56:59.9	ALMT (6 hrs)	Balapan, Semipalatinsk, Kazakhstan: Glubokaya-1 49.93336°N 78.75111°E	330 m (1,080 ft) +	underground shaft, weapons development		137 kt			
542 - 2	23 December 1979 04:56:59.9	ALMT (6 hrs)	Balapan, Semipalatinsk, Kazakhstan: Glubokaya-1 49.93336°N 78.75111°E	330 m (1,080 ft) +	underground shaft, weapons development		unknown yield			
