= 1980 Soviet nuclear tests =

1980
- Nuclear blast animation

Information
- Country: Soviet Union
- Test site: Astrakhan, Russia; Balapan, Semipalatinsk, Kazakhstan; Bashkortostan, Russia; Degelen, Semipalatinsk, Kazakhstan; Khanty-Mansi, Russia; Krasnoyarsk, Russia; NZ Area B, Matochkin Shar, Novaya Zemlya, Russia; Sary-Uzen/Murzhik, Semipalatinsk, Kazakhstan
- Period: 1980
- Number of tests: 24
- Test type: underground shaft, tunnel
- Max. yield: 200 kilotonnes of TNT (840 TJ)

Test series chronology

The Soviet Union's 1980 nuclear test series was a group of 24 nuclear tests conducted in 1980. These tests (Note: A bomb test may be a salvo test, defined as two or more explosions "where a period of time between successive individual explosions does not exceed 5 seconds and where the burial points of all explosive devices can be connected by segments of straight lines, each of them connecting two burial points and does not exceed 40 kilometers in length". Mikhailov, V. N. "Catalog of World Wide Nuclear Testing". Begell-Atom, LLC. Archived from the original on 2014-04-26.) followed the 1979 Soviet nuclear tests series and preceded the 1981 Soviet nuclear tests series.

Soviet Union's 1980 series tests and detonations
Name (Note: The US, France and Great Britain have code-named their test events, while the USSR and China did not, and therefore have only test numbers (with some exceptions – Soviet peaceful explosions were named). Word translations into English in parentheses unless the name is a proper noun. A dash followed by a number indicates a member of a salvo event. The US also sometimes named the individual explosions in such a salvo test, which results in "name1 – 1(with name2)". If test is canceled or aborted, then the row data like date and location discloses the intended plans, where known.)	Date time (UT)	Local time zone (Note: To convert the UT time into standard local, add the number of hours in parentheses to the UT time; for local daylight saving time, add one additional hour. If the result is earlier than 00:00, add 24 hours and subtract 1 from the day; if it is 24:00 or later, subtract 24 hours and add 1 to the day. Historical time zone data obtained from the IANA time zone database.)	Location (Note: Rough place name and a latitude/longitude reference; for rocket-carried tests, the launch location is specified before the detonation location, if known. Some locations are extremely accurate; others (like airdrops and space blasts) may be quite inaccurate. "~" indicates a likely pro-forma rough location, shared with other tests in that same area.)	Elevation + height (Note: Elevation is the ground level at the point directly below the explosion relative to sea level; height is the additional distance added or subtracted by tower, balloon, shaft, tunnel, air drop or other contrivance. For rocket bursts the ground level is "N/A". In some cases it is not clear if the height is absolute or relative to ground, for example, Plumbbob/John. No number or units indicates the value is unknown, while "0" means zero. Sorting on this column is by elevation and height added together.)	Delivery, (Note: Atmospheric, airdrop, balloon, gun, cruise missile, rocket, surface, tower, and barge are all disallowed by the Partial Nuclear Test Ban Treaty. Sealed shaft and tunnel are underground, and remained useful under the PTBT. Intentional cratering tests are borderline; they occurred under the treaty, were sometimes protested, and generally overlooked if the test was declared to be a peaceful use.) Purpose (Note: Include weapons development, weapon effects, safety test, transport safety test, war, science, joint verification and industrial/peaceful, which may be further broken down.)	Device (Note: Designations for test items where known, "?" indicates some uncertainty about the preceding value, nicknames for particular devices in quotes. This category of information is often not officially disclosed.)	Yield (Note: Estimated energy yield in tons, kilotons, and megatons. A ton of TNT equivalent is defined as 4.184 gigajoules (1 gigacalorie).)	Fallout (Note: Radioactive emission to the atmosphere aside from prompt neutrons, where known. The measured species is only iodine-131 if mentioned, otherwise it is all species. No entry means unknown, probably none if underground and "all" if not; otherwise notation for whether measured on the site only or off the site, where known, and the measured amount of radioactivity released.)	References	Notes
543	14 March 1980	ALMT (6 hrs)	Degelen, Semipalatinsk, Kazakhstan: 603p 49.81697°N 78.04039°E	677 m (2,221 ft) +	tunnel, safety experiment		1000 kg			
544	4 April 1980 05:32:59.83	ALMT (6 hrs)	Sary-Uzen/Murzhik, Semipalatinsk, Kazakhstan: 126 50.0002°N 77.83061°E	460 m (1,510 ft) +	underground shaft, weapons development		6 kt			
545 - 1	10 April 1980 04:07:00.19	ALMT (6 hrs)	Degelen, Semipalatinsk, Kazakhstan: 181 49.778°N 78.0547°E	655 m (2,149 ft) +	tunnel, weapons development		8 kt			
545 - 2	10 April 1980 04:07:00.2	ALMT (6 hrs)	Degelen, Semipalatinsk, Kazakhstan: 181 49.778°N 78.0547°E	655 m (2,149 ft) +	tunnel, weapons development		unknown yield			
546 - 1	25 April 1980 03:57:00.06	ALMT (6 hrs)	Balapan, Semipalatinsk, Kazakhstan: 1071 49.97749°N 78.75886°E	330 m (1,080 ft) +	underground shaft, weapons development		19 kt			
546 - 2	25 April 1980 03:57:00.1	ALMT (6 hrs)	Balapan, Semipalatinsk, Kazakhstan: 1071 49.97749°N 78.75886°E	330 m (1,080 ft) +	underground shaft, weapons development		unknown yield			
547 - 1	22 May 1980 03:57:00.14	ALMT (6 hrs)	Degelen, Semipalatinsk, Kazakhstan: 173 49.7739°N 78.0287°E	691 m (2,267 ft) +	tunnel, weapons development		35 kt			
547 - 2	22 May 1980 03:57:00.1	ALMT (6 hrs)	Degelen, Semipalatinsk, Kazakhstan: 173 49.7739°N 78.0287°E	691 m (2,267 ft) +	tunnel, weapons development		unknown yield			
547 - 3	22 May 1980 03:57:00.1	ALMT (6 hrs)	Degelen, Semipalatinsk, Kazakhstan: 173 49.7739°N 78.0287°E	691 m (2,267 ft) +	tunnel, weapons development		unknown yield			
548	12 June 1980 03:27:00.19	ALMT (6 hrs)	Balapan, Semipalatinsk, Kazakhstan: 1083 49.99°N 78.99058°E	330 m (1,080 ft) +	underground shaft, weapons development		37 kt			
549 Butan 1 (Butane)	16 June 1980 06:00:00.0	SVET (5 hrs)	Bashkortostan, Russia: 1 52.9°N 56.5°E	– 1,400 m (4,600 ft)	underground shaft, oil stimulation		3.2 kt			Oil recovery intensification. 40 km E Meleuz.
551	25 June 1980 02:27:00.0	ALMT (6 hrs)	Degelen, Semipalatinsk, Kazakhstan: 127 49.8227°N 78.10707°E	650 m (2,130 ft) – 152 m (499 ft)	tunnel, weapons development		300 t			
550 Butan 3 (Butane)	25 June 1980 06:00:00.0	SVET (5 hrs)	Bashkortostan, Russia: 3 52.9°N 56.5°E	– 1,390 m (4,560 ft)	underground shaft, oil stimulation		3.2 kt			Oil recovery intensification. 40 km E Meleuz.
552 - 1	29 June 1980 02:33:00.24	ALMT (6 hrs)	Balapan, Semipalatinsk, Kazakhstan: 1227 49.94861°N 78.81806°E	330 m (1,080 ft) +	underground shaft, weapons development		44 kt			
552 - 2	29 June 1980 02:33:00.2	ALMT (6 hrs)	Balapan, Semipalatinsk, Kazakhstan: 1227 49.94861°N 78.81806°E	330 m (1,080 ft) +	underground shaft, weapons development		unknown yield			
552 - 3	29 June 1980 02:33:00.2	ALMT (6 hrs)	Balapan, Semipalatinsk, Kazakhstan: 1227 49.94861°N 78.81806°E	330 m (1,080 ft) +	underground shaft, weapons development		unknown yield			
553 - 1	31 July 1980 03:33:00.07	ALMT (6 hrs)	Degelen, Semipalatinsk, Kazakhstan: 902 49.7955°N 78.0907°E	689 m (2,260 ft) +	tunnel, weapons development		20 kt			
553 - 2	31 July 1980 03:33:00.1	ALMT (6 hrs)	Degelen, Semipalatinsk, Kazakhstan: 902 49.7955°N 78.0907°E	689 m (2,260 ft) +	tunnel, weapons development		unknown yield			
554	14 September 1980 02:42:41.71	ALMT (6 hrs)	Balapan, Semipalatinsk, Kazakhstan: 1220 49.93724°N 78.79659°E	330 m (1,080 ft) +	underground shaft, weapons development		200 kt			
555 Dynamica (Dynamic)	25 September 1980 06:21:13.06	ALMT (6 hrs)	Degelen, Semipalatinsk, Kazakhstan: K-1 49.7855°N 78.0805°E	663 m (2,175 ft) +	tunnel, weapon effect		5 kt			
556 Vega 1T	8 October 1980 06:00:00.3	VOLT (4 hrs)	Astrakhan, Russia: 1T 46.75645°N 48.27378°E	10 m (33 ft) – 1,025 m (3,363 ft)	underground shaft, cavity excavation		8.5 kt			Create reservoirs for gas storage.
557 - 1	11 October 1980 07:09:57.47	MSK (3 hrs)	NZ Area B, Matochkin Shar, Novaya Zemlya, Russia: A-25 73.336°N 54.94°E	100 m (330 ft) – 600 m (2,000 ft)	tunnel, weapons development		130 kt			
557 - 2	11 October 1980 07:09:57.5	MSK (3 hrs)	NZ Area B, Matochkin Shar, Novaya Zemlya, Russia: A-25 73.336°N 54.94°E	100 m (330 ft) +	tunnel, weapons development		unknown yield			
557 - 3	11 October 1980 07:09:57.5	MSK (3 hrs)	NZ Area B, Matochkin Shar, Novaya Zemlya, Russia: A-25 73.336°N 54.94°E	100 m (330 ft) +	tunnel, weapons development		unknown yield			
557 - 4	11 October 1980 07:09:57.5	MSK (3 hrs)	NZ Area B, Matochkin Shar, Novaya Zemlya, Russia: A-25 73.336°N 54.94°E	100 m (330 ft) +	tunnel, weapons development		unknown yield			
557 - 5	11 October 1980 07:09:58	MSK (3 hrs)	NZ Area B, Matochkin Shar, Novaya Zemlya, Russia: A-30 73.3°N 54.9°E	100 m (330 ft) +	tunnel, weapons development		unknown yield	Venting detected off site, 5 Ci (180 GBq)		
557 - 6	11 October 1980 07:09:58	MSK (3 hrs)	NZ Area B, Matochkin Shar, Novaya Zemlya, Russia: A-30 73.3°N 54.9°E	100 m (330 ft) +	tunnel, weapons development		unknown yield			
557 - 7	11 October 1980 07:09:58	MSK (3 hrs)	NZ Area B, Matochkin Shar, Novaya Zemlya, Russia: A-30 73.3°N 54.9°E	100 m (330 ft) +	tunnel, weapons development		unknown yield			
558 - 1	12 October 1980 03:34:16.65	ALMT (6 hrs)	Balapan, Semipalatinsk, Kazakhstan: 1087 49.9675°N 79.0225°E	330 m (1,080 ft) – 440 m (1,440 ft)	underground shaft, weapons development		102 kt	Venting detected		
558 - 2	12 October 1980 03:34:16.7	ALMT (6 hrs)	Balapan, Semipalatinsk, Kazakhstan: 1087 49.9675°N 79.0225°E	330 m (1,080 ft) – 510 m (1,670 ft)	underground shaft, weapons development		unknown yield			
559	23 October 1980 03:57:11.0	ALMT (6 hrs)	Degelen, Semipalatinsk, Kazakhstan: 204p 49.74813°N 78.12673°E	579 m (1,900 ft) +	tunnel, weapons development		unknown yield			
560 Batolit 1 (Batholith)	1 November 1980 13:00:00.4	KRAT (7 hrs)	Krasnoyarsk, Russia: BT-1 60.8°N 97.55°E	– 720 m (2,360 ft)	underground shaft, seismic sounding		8 kt			Seismic probing program. 430 km NW Ust-Ilimsk, Irkutsk.
561	5 December 1980 04:17:??	ALMT (6 hrs)	Degelen, Semipalatinsk, Kazakhstan: 204-pp 49.74919°N 78.1282°E	579 m (1,900 ft) – 36 m (118 ft)	tunnel, weapons development		100 t	Venting detected		
562 - 1	5 December 1980 04:17:16.0	ALMT (6 hrs)	Degelen, Semipalatinsk, Kazakhstan: 111p 49.83083°N 78.11389°E	640 m (2,100 ft) +	tunnel, weapons development		unknown yield			
562 - 2	5 December 1980 04:17:16.0	ALMT (6 hrs)	Degelen, Semipalatinsk, Kazakhstan: 111p 49.83083°N 78.11389°E	640 m (2,100 ft) +	tunnel, weapons development		unknown yield			
562 - 3	5 December 1980 04:17:16.0	ALMT (6 hrs)	Degelen, Semipalatinsk, Kazakhstan: 111p 49.83083°N 78.11389°E	640 m (2,100 ft) +	tunnel, weapons development		unknown yield			
563 Angara	10 December 1980 07:00:00.1	SVET (5 hrs)	Khanty-Mansi, Russia 61.74616°N 66.77651°E	– 2,485 m (8,153 ft)	underground shaft, oil stimulation		15 kt			Oil recovery intensification. 150 km NW Khanty-Mansiysk.
564 - 1	14 December 1980 03:47:09.01	ALMT (6 hrs)	Balapan, Semipalatinsk, Kazakhstan: 1086 49.90968°N 78.91789°E	330 m (1,080 ft) +	underground shaft, weapons development		101 kt			
564 - 2	14 December 1980 03:47:09.0	ALMT (6 hrs)	Balapan, Semipalatinsk, Kazakhstan: 1086 49.90968°N 78.91789°E	330 m (1,080 ft) +	underground shaft, weapons development		unknown yield			
564 - 3	14 December 1980 03:47:09.0	ALMT (6 hrs)	Balapan, Semipalatinsk, Kazakhstan: 1086 49.90968°N 78.91789°E	330 m (1,080 ft) +	underground shaft, weapons development		unknown yield			
565	26 December 1980 04:07:09.3	ALMT (6 hrs)	Degelen, Semipalatinsk, Kazakhstan: Z-2p 49.8254°N 78.08079°E	660 m (2,170 ft) +	tunnel, weapons development		2 kt			
566 - 1	27 December 1980 04:09:10.63	ALMT (6 hrs)	Balapan, Semipalatinsk, Kazakhstan: 1303 50.06781°N 78.97432°E	330 m (1,080 ft) +	underground shaft, weapons development		100 kt			
566 - 2	27 December 1980 04:09:10.6	ALMT (6 hrs)	Balapan, Semipalatinsk, Kazakhstan: 1303 50.06781°N 78.97423°E	330 m (1,080 ft) +	underground shaft, weapons development		unknown yield			
