= 1976 Soviet nuclear tests =

1976

Information
- Country: Soviet Union
- Test site: Atyrau, Kazakhstan; Balapan, Semipalatinsk, Kazakhstan; Degelen, Semipalatinsk, Kazakhstan; NZ Area B, Matochkin Shar, Novaya Zemlya, Russia; Sakha, Russia; Sary-Uzen/Murzhik, Semipalatinsk, Kazakhstan
- Period: 1976
- Number of tests: 21
- Test type: underground shaft, tunnel
- Max. yield: 130 kilotonnes of TNT (540 TJ)

Test series chronology

The Soviet Union's 1976 nuclear test series was a group of 21 nuclear tests conducted in 1976. These tests (Note: A bomb test may be a salvo test, defined as two or more explosions "where a period of time between successive individual explosions does not exceed 5 seconds and where the burial points of all explosive devices can be connected by segments of straight lines, each of them connecting two burial points and does not exceed 40 kilometers in length". Mikhailov, V. N. "Catalog of World Wide Nuclear Testing". Begell-Atom, LLC. Archived from the original on 2014-04-26.) followed the 1975 Soviet nuclear tests series and preceded the 1977 Soviet nuclear tests series.

Soviet Union's 1976 series tests and detonations
Name (Note: The US, France and Great Britain have code-named their test events, while the USSR and China did not, and therefore have only test numbers (with some exceptions – Soviet peaceful explosions were named). Word translations into English in parentheses unless the name is a proper noun. A dash followed by a number indicates a member of a salvo event. The US also sometimes named the individual explosions in such a salvo test, which results in "name1 – 1(with name2)". If test is canceled or aborted, then the row data like date and location discloses the intended plans, where known.)	Date time (UT)	Local time zone (Note: To convert the UT time into standard local, add the number of hours in parentheses to the UT time; for local daylight saving time, add one additional hour. If the result is earlier than 00:00, add 24 hours and subtract 1 from the day; if it is 24:00 or later, subtract 24 hours and add 1 to the day. Historical time zone data obtained from the IANA time zone database.)	Location (Note: Rough place name and a latitude/longitude reference; for rocket-carried tests, the launch location is specified before the detonation location, if known. Some locations are extremely accurate; others (like airdrops and space blasts) may be quite inaccurate. "~" indicates a likely pro-forma rough location, shared with other tests in that same area.)	Elevation + height (Note: Elevation is the ground level at the point directly below the explosion relative to sea level; height is the additional distance added or subtracted by tower, balloon, shaft, tunnel, air drop or other contrivance. For rocket bursts the ground level is "N/A". In some cases it is not clear if the height is absolute or relative to ground, for example, Plumbbob/John. No number or units indicates the value is unknown, while "0" means zero. Sorting on this column is by elevation and height added together.)	Delivery, (Note: Atmospheric, airdrop, balloon, gun, cruise missile, rocket, surface, tower, and barge are all disallowed by the Partial Nuclear Test Ban Treaty. Sealed shaft and tunnel are underground, and remained useful under the PTBT. Intentional cratering tests are borderline; they occurred under the treaty, were sometimes protested, and generally overlooked if the test was declared to be a peaceful use.) Purpose (Note: Include weapons development, weapon effects, safety test, transport safety test, war, science, joint verification and industrial/peaceful, which may be further broken down.)	Device (Note: Designations for test items where known, "?" indicates some uncertainty about the preceding value, nicknames for particular devices in quotes. This category of information is often not officially disclosed.)	Yield (Note: Estimated energy yield in tons, kilotons, and megatons. A ton of TNT equivalent is defined as 4.184 gigajoules (1 gigacalorie).)	Fallout (Note: Radioactive emission to the atmosphere aside from prompt neutrons, where known. The measured species is only iodine-131 if mentioned, otherwise it is all species. No entry means unknown, probably none if underground and "all" if not; otherwise notation for whether measured on the site only or off the site, where known, and the measured amount of radioactivity released.)	References	Notes
436	15 January 1976 04:46:59.97	ALMT (6 hrs)	Degelen, Semipalatinsk, Kazakhstan: 115 49.812°N 78.1576°E	602 m (1,975 ft) +	tunnel, weapons development		13 kt			
437	17 March 1976 02:57:00.0	ALMT (6 hrs)	Degelen, Semipalatinsk, Kazakhstan: 608 49.75496°N 78.09259°E	642 m (2,106 ft) +	tunnel, weapons development		unknown yield	Venting detected		
438 Galit A3.1 (Halite)	29 March 1976 07:00:00.2	SHET (5 hrs)	Atyrau, Kazakhstan: A-III-2 47.88767°N 48.12925°E	– 990 m (3,250 ft)	underground shaft, industrial		10 kt			Create reservoirs for gas storage. Reused cavity created by #352.
439	10 April 1976 05:03:00.0	ALMT (6 hrs)	Degelen, Semipalatinsk, Kazakhstan: 609p 49.75725°N 78.04221°E	715 m (2,346 ft) – 130 m (430 ft)	tunnel, weapons development		100 t	Venting detected		
441	21 April 1976 04:58:00.16	ALMT (6 hrs)	Degelen, Semipalatinsk, Kazakhstan: 101p 49.7462°N 78.106°E	650 m (2,130 ft) +	tunnel, weapons development		7 kt			
440	21 April 1976 05:02:59.7	ALMT (6 hrs)	Balapan, Semipalatinsk, Kazakhstan: 1201 49.90155°N 78.82874°E	330 m (1,080 ft) +	underground shaft, weapons development		7 kt			
442	19 May 1976 02:57:00.2	ALMT (6 hrs)	Degelen, Semipalatinsk, Kazakhstan: 163p 49.777°N 78.0009°E	749 m (2,457 ft) +	tunnel, weapons development		3.7 kt			
443	9 June 1976 03:02:59.79	ALMT (6 hrs)	Balapan, Semipalatinsk, Kazakhstan: 1075 49.99457°N 79.02372°E	330 m (1,080 ft) +	underground shaft, weapons development		10 kt			
444	4 July 1976 02:56:59.99	ALMT (6 hrs)	Balapan, Semipalatinsk, Kazakhstan: 1062 49.90417°N 78.89944°E	330 m (1,080 ft) +	underground shaft, weapons development		65 kt			
445	23 July 1976 02:33:00.19	ALMT (6 hrs)	Degelen, Semipalatinsk, Kazakhstan: 185 49.7492°N 78.0617°E	394 m (1,293 ft) +	tunnel, weapons development		7 kt			
446 Galit A4 (Halite)	29 July 1976 05:00:00.5	SHET (5 hrs)	Atyrau, Kazakhstan: A-IV 47.87109°N 48.13768°E	– 1,000 m (3,300 ft)	underground shaft, cavity excavation		58 kt			Create reservoirs for gas storage.
447	4 August 1976 02:57:00.0	ALMT (6 hrs)	Sary-Uzen/Murzhik, Semipalatinsk, Kazakhstan: 133 49.87364°N 77.70297°E	460 m (1,510 ft) +	underground shaft, weapons development		900 t			
448	28 August 1976 02:57:00.04	ALMT (6 hrs)	Balapan, Semipalatinsk, Kazakhstan: 1202 49.96948°N 78.93893°E	330 m (1,080 ft) +	underground shaft, weapons development		53 kt			
449 - 1	29 September 1976 02:59:57.7	MSK (3 hrs)	NZ Area B, Matochkin Shar, Novaya Zemlya, Russia: A-14 73.36°N 54.871°E	100 m (330 ft) – 400 m (1,300 ft)	tunnel, weapons development		130 kt	Venting detected off site, 10 Ci (370 GBq)		
449 - 2	29 September 1976 02:59:57.7	MSK (3 hrs)	NZ Area B, Matochkin Shar, Novaya Zemlya, Russia: A-14 73.36°N 54.871°E	100 m (330 ft) +	tunnel, weapons development		unknown yield			
450 - 1	20 October 1976 07:59:58.07	MSK (3 hrs)	NZ Area B, Matochkin Shar, Novaya Zemlya, Russia: A-15 73.398°N 54.812°E	100 m (330 ft) – 300 m (980 ft)	tunnel, weapons development		13 kt			
450 - 2	20 October 1976 07:59:58.1	MSK (3 hrs)	NZ Area B, Matochkin Shar, Novaya Zemlya, Russia: A-15 73.398°N 54.812°E	100 m (330 ft) +	tunnel, weapons development		unknown yield			
450 - 3	20 October 1976 07:59:58.1	MSK (3 hrs)	NZ Area B, Matochkin Shar, Novaya Zemlya, Russia: A-15 73.398°N 54.812°E	100 m (330 ft) +	tunnel, fundamental science		unknown yield			
450 - 4	20 October 1976 07:59:58.1	MSK (3 hrs)	NZ Area B, Matochkin Shar, Novaya Zemlya, Russia: A-15 73.398°N 54.812°E	100 m (330 ft) +	tunnel, safety experiment		1000 kg			
451	30 October 1976 04:57:00.21	ALMT (6 hrs)	Degelen, Semipalatinsk, Kazakhstan: 143 49.8285°N 78.0516°E	625 m (2,051 ft) +	tunnel, weapon effect		2.8 kt			
452 Oka (Neva)	5 November 1976 04:00:00.0	YAKT (9 hrs)	Sakha, Russia: 42 61.458°N 112.86°E	– 1,525 m (5,003 ft)	underground shaft, oil stimulation		15 kt			120 km SW Mirnyi.
453	23 November 1976 05:02:59.84	ALMT (6 hrs)	Balapan, Semipalatinsk, Kazakhstan: 1207bis 50.01803°N 78.94319°E	330 m (1,080 ft) +	underground shaft, weapons development		74 kt			
454 - 1	7 December 1976 04:56:59.98	ALMT (6 hrs)	Balapan, Semipalatinsk, Kazakhstan: 1304 49.9445°N 78.83825°E	330 m (1,080 ft) +	underground shaft, weapons development		54 kt			
454 - 2	7 December 1976 04:57:00.0	ALMT (6 hrs)	Balapan, Semipalatinsk, Kazakhstan: 1304 49.9445°N 78.83825°E	330 m (1,080 ft) +	underground shaft, weapons development		unknown yield			
455	7 December 1976 04:57:??	ALMT (6 hrs)	Balapan, Semipalatinsk, Kazakhstan: 1209 49.90019°N 78.78558°E	330 m (1,080 ft) +	underground shaft, weapons development		95 kt			
456 - 1	30 December 1976 03:57:00.31	ALMT (6 hrs)	Degelen, Semipalatinsk, Kazakhstan: 706p 49.7686°N 78.0331°E	689 m (2,260 ft) +	tunnel, weapons development		10 kt			
456 - 2	30 December 1976 03:57:00.3	ALMT (6 hrs)	Degelen, Semipalatinsk, Kazakhstan: 706p 49.7686°N 78.0331°E	689 m (2,260 ft) +	tunnel, weapons development		unknown yield			
