= 1978 Soviet nuclear tests =

1978
- Nuclear blast animation

Information
- Country: Soviet Union
- Test site: Atyrau, Kazakhstan; Balapan, Semipalatinsk, Kazakhstan; Degelen, Semipalatinsk, Kazakhstan; Khanty-Mansi, Russia; Krasnoyarsk, Russia; NZ Area B, Matochkin Shar, Novaya Zemlya, Russia; Sakha, Russia; Sary-Uzen/Murzhik, Semipalatinsk, Kazakhstan
- Period: 1978
- Number of tests: 31
- Test type: underground shaft, tunnel
- Max. yield: 180 kilotonnes of TNT (750 TJ)

Test series chronology

The Soviet Union's 1978 nuclear test series was a group of 31 nuclear tests conducted in 1978. These tests (Note: A bomb test may be a salvo test, defined as two or more explosions "where a period of time between successive individual explosions does not exceed 5 seconds and where the burial points of all explosive devices can be connected by segments of straight lines, each of them connecting two burial points and does not exceed 40 kilometers in length". Mikhailov, V. N. "Catalog of World Wide Nuclear Testing". Begell-Atom, LLC. Archived from the original on 26 April 2014.) followed the 1977 Soviet nuclear tests series and preceded the 1979 Soviet nuclear tests series.

Soviet Union's 1978 series tests and detonations
Name (Note: The US, France and Great Britain have code-named their test events, while the USSR and China did not, and therefore have only test numbers (with some exceptions – Soviet peaceful explosions were named). Word translations into English in parentheses unless the name is a proper noun. A dash followed by a number indicates a member of a salvo event. The US also sometimes named the individual explosions in such a salvo test, which results in "name1 – 1(with name2)". If test is canceled or aborted, then the row data like date and location discloses the intended plans, where known.)	Date time (UT)	Local time zone (Note: To convert the UT time into standard local, add the number of hours in parentheses to the UT time; for local daylight saving time, add one additional hour. If the result is earlier than 00:00, add 24 hours and subtract 1 from the day; if it is 24:00 or later, subtract 24 hours and add 1 to the day. Historical time zone data obtained from the IANA time zone database.)	Location (Note: Rough place name and a latitude/longitude reference; for rocket-carried tests, the launch location is specified before the detonation location, if known. Some locations are extremely accurate; others (like airdrops and space blasts) may be quite inaccurate. "~" indicates a likely pro-forma rough location, shared with other tests in that same area.)	Elevation + height (Note: Elevation is the ground level at the point directly below the explosion relative to sea level; height is the additional distance added or subtracted by tower, balloon, shaft, tunnel, air drop or other contrivance. For rocket bursts the ground level is "N/A". In some cases it is not clear if the height is absolute or relative to ground, for example, Plumbbob/John. No number or units indicates the value is unknown, while "0" means zero. Sorting on this column is by elevation and height added together.)	Delivery, (Note: Atmospheric, airdrop, balloon, gun, cruise missile, rocket, surface, tower, and barge are all disallowed by the Partial Nuclear Test Ban Treaty. Sealed shaft and tunnel are underground, and remained useful under the PTBT. Intentional cratering tests are borderline; they occurred under the treaty, were sometimes protested, and generally overlooked if the test was declared to be a peaceful use.) Purpose (Note: Include weapons development, weapon effects, safety test, transport safety test, war, science, joint verification and industrial/peaceful, which may be further broken down.)	Device (Note: Designations for test items where known, "?" indicates some uncertainty about the preceding value, nicknames for particular devices in quotes. This category of information is often not officially disclosed.)	Yield (Note: Estimated energy yield in tons, kilotons, and megatons. A ton of TNT equivalent is defined as 4.184 gigajoules (1 gigacalorie).)	Fallout (Note: Radioactive emission to the atmosphere aside from prompt neutrons, where known. The measured species is only iodine-131 if mentioned, otherwise it is all species. No entry means unknown, probably none if underground and "all" if not; otherwise notation for whether measured on the site only or off the site, where known, and the measured amount of radioactivity released.)	References	Notes
481	19 March 1978 03:46:59.82	ALMT (6 hrs)	Sary-Uzen/Murzhik, Semipalatinsk, Kazakhstan: 2691 49.80621°N 78.11687°E	460 m (1,510 ft) +	underground shaft, weapons development		13 kt			
482 – 1	26 March 1978 03:56:59.96	ALMT (6 hrs)	Degelen, Semipalatinsk, Kazakhstan: 701 49.7643°N 77.9993°E	704 m (2,310 ft) – 260 m (850 ft)	tunnel, weapons development		30 kt			
482 – 2	26 March 1978 03:57:00.0	ALMT (6 hrs)	Degelen, Semipalatinsk, Kazakhstan: 701 49.7643°N 77.9993°E	704 m (2,310 ft) +	tunnel, weapons development		unknown yield			
483 – 1	22 April 1978 03:07:00.01	ALMT (6 hrs)	Degelen, Semipalatinsk, Kazakhstan: 204 49.7469°N 78.1251°E	579 m (1,900 ft) +	tunnel, weapons development		20 kt			
483 – 2	22 April 1978 03:07:00.0	ALMT (6 hrs)	Degelen, Semipalatinsk, Kazakhstan: 204 49.7469°N 78.1251°E	579 m (1,900 ft) +	tunnel, weapons development		unknown yield			
483 – 3	22 April 1978 03:07:00.0	ALMT (6 hrs)	Degelen, Semipalatinsk, Kazakhstan: 204 49.7469°N 78.1251°E	579 m (1,900 ft) +	tunnel, weapons development		unknown yield			
484	24 May 1978 03:07:00	ALMT (6 hrs)	Degelen, Semipalatinsk, Kazakhstan: 185p 49.74721°N 78.05809°E	394 m (1,293 ft) +	tunnel, safety experiment		1000 kg			
485	29 May 1978 04:56:59.85	ALMT (6 hrs)	Degelen, Semipalatinsk, Kazakhstan: 133p 49.7986°N 78.1022°E	686 m (2,251 ft) +	tunnel, weapon effect		3 kt			
486	2 June 1978	ALMT (6 hrs)	Degelen, Semipalatinsk, Kazakhstan: 185-pp 49.74828°N 78.06006°E	394 m (1,293 ft) +	tunnel, safety experiment		1000 kg			
487	11 June 1978 02:57:00.14	ALMT (6 hrs)	Balapan, Semipalatinsk, Kazakhstan: 1010 49.91406°N 78.80121°E	330 m (1,080 ft) +	underground shaft, weapons development		58 kt			
488	5 July 1978 02:47:00.05	ALMT (6 hrs)	Balapan, Semipalatinsk, Kazakhstan: 1077 49.90376°N 78.86647°E	330 m (1,080 ft) +	underground shaft, weapons development		87 kt			
489 – 1	28 July 1978 02:46:59.89	ALMT (6 hrs)	Degelen, Semipalatinsk, Kazakhstan: 104 49.7488°N 78.0893°E	623 m (2,044 ft) +	tunnel, weapons development		60 kt			
489 – 2	28 July 1978 02:46:59.9	ALMT (6 hrs)	Degelen, Semipalatinsk, Kazakhstan: 104 49.7488°N 78.0893°E	623 m (2,044 ft) +	tunnel, weapons development		unknown yield			
489 – 3	28 July 1978 02:46:59.9	ALMT (6 hrs)	Degelen, Semipalatinsk, Kazakhstan: 104 49.7488°N 78.0893°E	623 m (2,044 ft) +	tunnel, weapons development		unknown yield			
489 – 4	28 July 1978 02:46:59.9	ALMT (6 hrs)	Degelen, Semipalatinsk, Kazakhstan: 104 49.7488°N 78.0893°E	623 m (2,044 ft) +	tunnel, weapons development		unknown yield			
489 – 5	28 July 1978 02:46:59.9	ALMT (6 hrs)	Degelen, Semipalatinsk, Kazakhstan: 104 49.7488°N 78.0893°E	623 m (2,044 ft) +	tunnel, weapons development		unknown yield			
490 Kraton 4 (Craton)	9 August 1978 18:00:00.8	YAKT (9 hrs)	Sakha, Russia: KR-4 63.678°N 125.522°E	– 560 m (1,840 ft)	underground shaft, seismic sounding		22 kt			Seismic probing program.
491 – 1	10 August 1978 07:59:57.93	MSK (3 hrs)	NZ Area B, Matochkin Shar, Novaya Zemlya, Russia: A-18 73.291°N 54.883°E	100 m (330 ft) +	tunnel, weapons development		180 kt			
491 – 2	10 August 1978 07:59:57.9	MSK (3 hrs)	NZ Area B, Matochkin Shar, Novaya Zemlya, Russia: A-18 73.291°N 54.883°E	100 m (330 ft) +	tunnel, weapons development		unknown yield			
491 – 3	10 August 1978 07:59:57.9	MSK (3 hrs)	NZ Area B, Matochkin Shar, Novaya Zemlya, Russia: A-18 73.291°N 54.883°E	100 m (330 ft) +	tunnel, weapons development		unknown yield			
491 – 4	10 August 1978 07:59:57.9	MSK (3 hrs)	NZ Area B, Matochkin Shar, Novaya Zemlya, Russia: A-18 73.291°N 54.883°E	100 m (330 ft) +	tunnel, weapons development		unknown yield			
491 – 5	10 August 1978 07:59:57.9	MSK (3 hrs)	NZ Area B, Matochkin Shar, Novaya Zemlya, Russia: A-18 73.291°N 54.883°E	100 m (330 ft) – 500 m (1,600 ft)	tunnel, weapons development		unknown yield	Venting detected on site, 70 Ci (2,600 GBq)		
491 – 6	10 August 1978 07:59:57.9	MSK (3 hrs)	NZ Area B, Matochkin Shar, Novaya Zemlya, Russia: A-18 73.291°N 54.883°E	100 m (330 ft) +	tunnel, fundamental science		unknown yield			
492 Kraton 3 (Craton)	24 August 1978 18:00:00.4	YAKT (9 hrs)	Sakha, Russia: KR-3 65.925°N 112.338°E	– 577 m (1,893 ft)	underground shaft, seismic sounding		22 kt	Venting detected		
493 – 1	29 August 1978 02:36:59.95	ALMT (6 hrs)	Degelen, Semipalatinsk, Kazakhstan: 107 49.8074°N 78.1091°E	770 m (2,530 ft) +	tunnel, weapons development		14 kt			
493 – 2	29 August 1978 02:37:00.0	ALMT (6 hrs)	Degelen, Semipalatinsk, Kazakhstan: 107 49.8074°N 78.1091°E	770 m (2,530 ft) +	tunnel, weapons development		unknown yield			
493 – 3	29 August 1978 02:37:00.0	ALMT (6 hrs)	Degelen, Semipalatinsk, Kazakhstan: 107 49.8074°N 78.1091°E	770 m (2,530 ft) +	tunnel, safety experiment		1000 kg			
494	29 August 1978 02:37:08.75	ALMT (6 hrs)	Balapan, Semipalatinsk, Kazakhstan: 1228 50.00965°N 78.96669°E	330 m (1,080 ft) +	underground shaft, weapons development		119 kt			
495 Galit A2.4 (Halite)	12 September 1978 04:59:58.5	SHET (5 hrs)	Atyrau, Kazakhstan: A-II-5 47.909°N 47.912°E	– 600 m (2,000 ft)	underground shaft, industrial		80 t			Create reservoirs for gas storage. A fizzle.
496	15 September 1978 02:36:59.97	ALMT (6 hrs)	Balapan, Semipalatinsk, Kazakhstan: 1211 49.92944°N 78.8614°E	330 m (1,080 ft) +	underground shaft, weapons development		81 kt			
497	20 September 1978 05:03:00.0	ALMT (6 hrs)	Degelen, Semipalatinsk, Kazakhstan: 605p 49.7934°N 78.1447°E	660 m (2,170 ft) +	tunnel, weapon effect		1.1 kt			
498 Kraton 2 (Craton)	21 September 1978 15:00:00.2	KRAT (7 hrs)	Krasnoyarsk, Russia: KR-2 66.598°N 86.21°E	– 890 m (2,920 ft)	underground shaft, seismic sounding		15 kt			Seismic probing program.
499 – 1	27 September 1978 02:04:58.6	MSK (3 hrs)	NZ Area B, Matochkin Shar, Novaya Zemlya, Russia: A-19 73.349°N 54.676°E	100 m (330 ft) – 350 m (1,150 ft)	tunnel, weapons development		60 kt			
499 – 2	27 September 1978 02:04:58.6	MSK (3 hrs)	NZ Area B, Matochkin Shar, Novaya Zemlya, Russia: A-19 73.349°N 54.676°E	100 m (330 ft) +	tunnel, weapons development		unknown yield			
499 – 3	27 September 1978 02:04:58.6	MSK (3 hrs)	NZ Area B, Matochkin Shar, Novaya Zemlya, Russia: A-19 73.349°N 54.676°E	100 m (330 ft) +	tunnel, weapons development		unknown yield			
499 – 4	27 September 1978 02:04:58.6	MSK (3 hrs)	NZ Area B, Matochkin Shar, Novaya Zemlya, Russia: A-19 73.349°N 54.676°E	100 m (330 ft) +	tunnel, weapons development		unknown yield			
499 – 5	27 September 1978 02:04:58.6	MSK (3 hrs)	NZ Area B, Matochkin Shar, Novaya Zemlya, Russia: A-19 73.349°N 54.676°E	100 m (330 ft) +	tunnel, weapons development		unknown yield			
499 – 6	27 September 1978 02:04:58.6	MSK (3 hrs)	NZ Area B, Matochkin Shar, Novaya Zemlya, Russia: A-19 73.349°N 54.676°E	100 m (330 ft) +	tunnel, weapons development		unknown yield			
499 – 7	27 September 1978 02:04:58.6	MSK (3 hrs)	NZ Area B, Matochkin Shar, Novaya Zemlya, Russia: A-19 73.349°N 54.676°E	100 m (330 ft) +	tunnel, safety experiment		1000 kg			
500 Vyatka (Neva)	8 October 1978 00:00:??	YAKT (9 hrs)	Sakha, Russia: 43 61.55°N 112.85°E	– 1,545 m (5,069 ft)	underground shaft, oil stimulation		15 kt			
501	15 October 1978 05:37:00.14	ALMT (6 hrs)	Degelen, Semipalatinsk, Kazakhstan: 200ASM 49.7395°N 78.1127°E	645 m (2,116 ft) +	tunnel, weapon effect		12 kt			
502 Galit A7 (Halite) – 1	17 October 1978 04:59:59.1	SHET (5 hrs)	Atyrau, Kazakhstan: A-VII 47.84661°N 48.12042°E	– 1,040 m (3,410 ft)	underground shaft, cavity excavation		56 kt			Create reservoirs for gas storage.
502 Galit A7 (Halite) – 2	17 October 1978 04:59:59.1	SHET (5 hrs)	Atyrau, Kazakhstan: A-VII 47.84661°N 48.12042°E	+	underground shaft, cavity excavation		18 kt			Create reservoirs for gas storage.
503 Kraton 1 (Craton)	17 October 1978 14:00:00.2	SVET (5 hrs)	Khanty-Mansi, Russia: KR-1 63.185°N 63.432°E	– 593 m (1,946 ft)	underground shaft, seismic sounding		22 kt			Seismic probing program.
504	31 October 1978 04:17:00.19	ALMT (6 hrs)	Degelen, Semipalatinsk, Kazakhstan: 194 49.7875°N 78.0974°E	638 m (2,093 ft) +	tunnel, fundamental science		16 kt			
505 – 1	4 November 1978 05:05:59.86	ALMT (6 hrs)	Balapan, Semipalatinsk, Kazakhstan: 1302 50.04706°N 78.94626°E	330 m (1,080 ft) +	underground shaft, weapons development		44 kt			
505 – 2	4 November 1978 05:05:59.9	ALMT (6 hrs)	Balapan, Semipalatinsk, Kazakhstan: 1302 50.04167°N 78.94722°E	330 m (1,080 ft) +	underground shaft, weapons development		unknown yield			
506 – 1	29 November 1978 04:33:00.17	ALMT (6 hrs)	Balapan, Semipalatinsk, Kazakhstan: 1222 49.95472°N 78.79395°E	330 m (1,080 ft) +	underground shaft, weapons development		101 kt			
506 – 2	29 November 1978 04:33:00.2	ALMT (6 hrs)	Balapan, Semipalatinsk, Kazakhstan: 1222 49.95472°N 78.79395°E	330 m (1,080 ft) +	underground shaft, weapons development		unknown yield			
507	29 November 1978 04:33:04.99	ALMT (6 hrs)	Degelen, Semipalatinsk, Kazakhstan: 162 49.7826°N 78.0073°E	750 m (2,460 ft) +	tunnel, weapons development		110 kt			
508 Galit A2.5 (Halite)	30 November 1978 07:59:59.1	SHET (5 hrs)	Atyrau, Kazakhstan: A-II-6 47.909°N 47.912°E	– 600 m (2,000 ft)	underground shaft, industrial		6 t			Create reservoirs for gas storage. A fizzle.
509	14 December 1978 04:43:00.03	ALMT (6 hrs)	Degelen, Semipalatinsk, Kazakhstan: 113p 49.8061°N 78.1034°E	768 m (2,520 ft) +	tunnel, weapons development		4 kt			
510 Galit A9 (Halite)	18 December 1978 07:59:58.5	SHET (5 hrs)	Atyrau, Kazakhstan: A-IX 47.85689°N 48.16091°E	– 630 m (2,070 ft)	underground shaft, cavity excavation		103 kt			Create reservoirs for gas storage.
511 – 1	20 December 1978 04:33:00.04	ALMT (6 hrs)	Degelen, Semipalatinsk, Kazakhstan: 803p 49.81083°N 78.05417°E	722 m (2,369 ft) +	tunnel, weapons development		3.5 kt			
511 – 2	20 December 1978 04:33:00.0	ALMT (6 hrs)	Degelen, Semipalatinsk, Kazakhstan: 803p 49.81083°N 78.05417°E	722 m (2,369 ft) +	tunnel, weapons development		unknown yield			
