= USS Tawasa =

Tugboat of the United States Navy

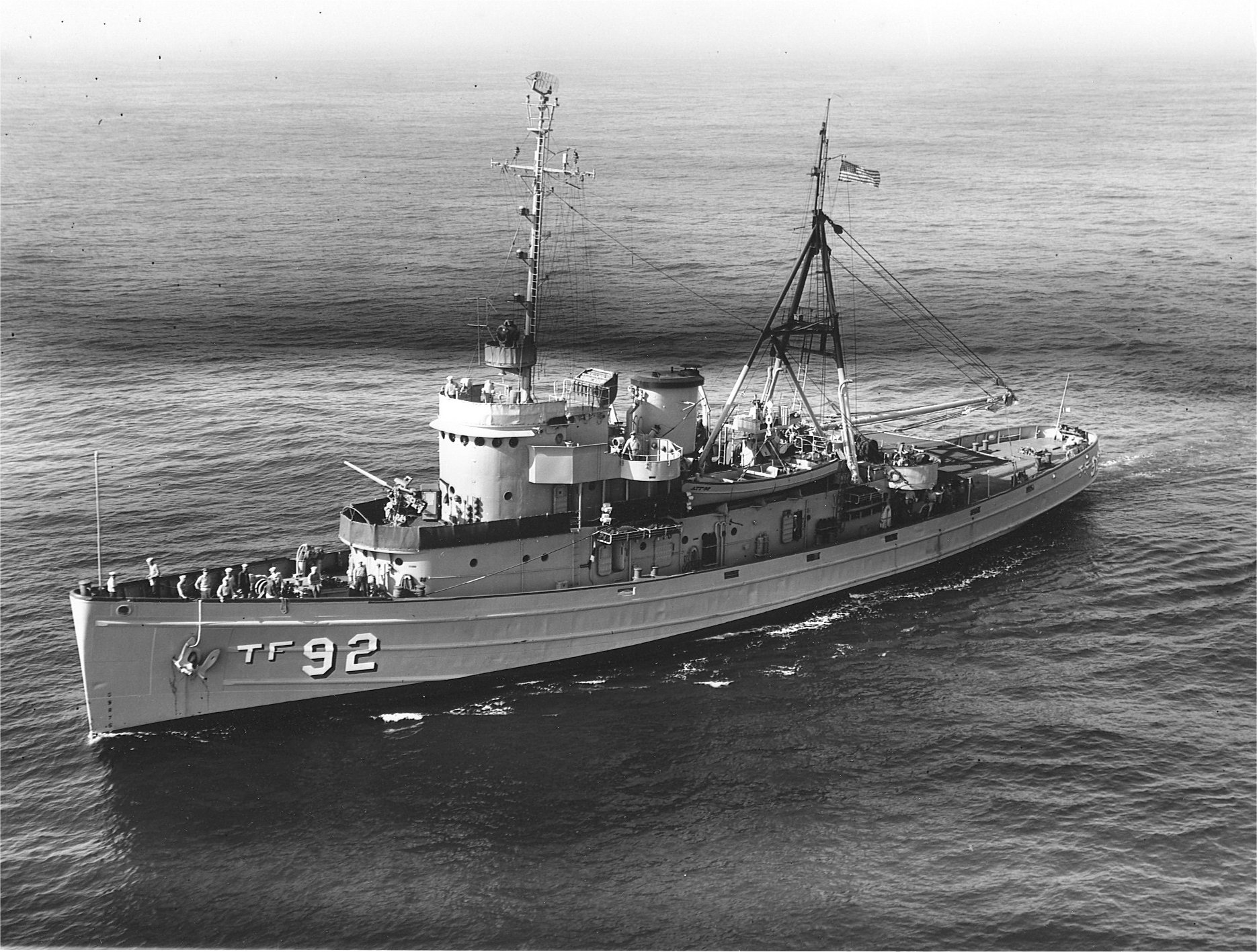

History

United States
- Name: USS Tawasa
- Builder: Commercial Iron Works, Portland, Oregon
- Laid down: 7 September 1942
- Launched: 22 February 1943
- Commissioned: 17 July 1943
- Decommissioned: 31 March 1975
- Reclassified: ATF-92, 15 May 1944
- Stricken: 1 April 1975
- Honors and awards: 3 battle stars (World War II); 2 battle stars (Korea); 7 battle stars (Vietnam)
- Fate: Sold for scrapping, 1 August 1976

General characteristics
- Class & type: Cherokee-class fleet tug
- Displacement: 1,235 long tons (1,255 t)
- Length: 205 ft (62 m)
- Beam: 38 ft 6 in (11.73 m)
- Draft: 15 ft 4 in (4.67 m)
- Propulsion: Diesel-electric; four General Motors 12-278A diesel main engines driving four General Electric generators and three General Motors 3-268A auxiliary services engines; single screw; 3,600 shp (2,685 kW)
- Speed: 16 knots (30 km/h; 18 mph)
- Complement: 85
- Armament: 1 × 3 in (76 mm) gun; 2 × twin 40 mm gun mounts; 2 × single 20 mm guns

USS Tawasa (AT-92) was a Cherokee-class fleet tug constructed for the United States Navy during World War II. Her purpose was to aid ships, usually by towing, on the high seas or in combat or post-combat areas, plus "other duties as assigned." She served in the Pacific Ocean and had a very successful career marked by the winning of three battle stars during World War II, two during the Korean War, and seven campaign stars during the Vietnam War.

Tawasa was laid down on 22 June 1942 at Portland, Oregon, by the Commercial Iron Works; launched on 22 February 1943; sponsored by Mrs. Thomas F. Sullivan, mother of the five Sullivan brothers; and commissioned on 17 July 1943.

== World War II Pacific Theatre operations ==
Tawasa held her shakedown cruise off the lower California coast in late August and returned to Portland. The tug steamed to San Pedro, California, in October and departed there on the 20th for Hawaii, towing two fuel oil barges. She arrived at Pearl Harbor on 4 November and was assigned to Service Force, Pacific Fleet. The next day, the tug headed for the Ellice Islands and arrived at Funafuti on the 20th.

== Supporting invasion forces ==
Tawasa was routed onward to the Gilbert Islands and arrived on 26 November at Abemama, which, only the day before, had been taken by American marines. On 3 December, she moved to Tarawa. The tug made round trips between Tarawa and Funafuti in December 1943 and January 1944. On 21 January, she stood out of Tarawa and rendezvoused with Task Force (TF) 52, the Southern Attack Force, for the invasion of the Marshall Islands. Off Kwajalein Atoll on the 31st, Tawasa took soundings enabling Mississippi (BB-41) to approach the shore for close bombardment. The tug then performed salvage, towing, and screening duty until 18 February when she moved to Eniwetok to assist in the assault that was to strike that atoll the next morning. She supported operations until the atoll was secured and remained in the area for almost two months, providing services to American ships using this new base. Tawasa departed the Marshalls on 12 April for a tender availability at Pearl Harbor and to have a radar installed.

The tug returned to the Marshalls on 25 May. On 11 June, she was in the transport screen of TF 52, the Northern Attack Force, when it sortied for the Mariana Islands. Four days later, she was detached to assist LST's as they landed marines and equipment on Saipan. On 7 July, she got underway for Eniwetok.

Tawasa operated with ServRon 10 from 31 July to 24 August 1944 when she joined ServRon, South Pacific. The ship operated in the South Pacific until 9 May 1946 when she departed Nouméa for the United States.

== Post-war activity ==
From San Pedro, her home port, she operated along the California coast until returning to Pearl Harbor on 27 December 1946. On 23 February 1947, Tawasa headed for Japan and an eight-month tour at Yokosuka before returning home on 30 October 1947.

The tug headed for Alaska on 15 June 1948 and operated out of Adak until October when she steamed to Guam for four months. She then remained on the west coast until 10 August 1950 when she got underway for a five-month tour in Alaska. During the next decade, her operations on the west coast were broken by seven deployments to the Far East for operations with the 7th Fleet.

== Korean War operations ==
On the first of these deployments, from 4 June 1952 to 1 March 1953, Tawasa operated with task force TF 92, the Logistics Support Force which supplied United Nations forces in Korea. She also performed services at the Korean ports of Cho Do, Sokcho, and Chinhae.

== Operation Wigwam ==
Tawasa towed a nuclear bomb used as a depth charge as it was detonated in Operation Wigwam in 1955. Wigwam involved a single test of the Mark 90 Betty nuclear bomb, a Cold War nuclear depth charge, developed by the United States in 1952. The test was conducted on May 14, 1955, about 500 miles (800 km) southwest of San Diego, California, with 6,800 personnel aboard 30 ships involved. The purpose of Wigwam was to determine the vulnerability of submarines to deeply detonated nuclear weapons, and to evaluate the feasibility of using such weapons. The test device was suspended to a depth of 2,000 feet (610 m) by a cable attached to a barge. A 6-mile (9.7 km) tow line connected the 205 ft. Tawasa fleet tug with the shot barge itself. Suspended from the tow lines of other tugs were three miniature unmanned submarines named "Squaws", each packed with cameras and telemetry instruments.

The time of detonation was 1300 hrs Pacific Time. The test was carried out without incident, and the device yielded 30 kilotons. Three personnel received doses of over 0.5 rem (5 mSv). Other sailors on USS Cree (another Cherokee-class fleet tug) were tasked with measuring radiation and said that the ocean water boiled and churned, and radiation meters went off the charts when they held them over the side. The sailors wore no protection, only their standard cotton clothes. One sailor on the Cree had three cornea transplants without any official recognition by the U.S. government. The feeling on the feet of the sailors when it went off was like a sledge hammer hitting the deck of the ship.

== 1962 and later ==
Tawasa deployed to the western Pacific again from 13 February 1962 to 3 July 1962. On 29 December 1962, she took Plaice (SS-390) in tow at San Francisco, California, and delivered the submarine to Pearl Harbor before returning to San Diego, California, on 1 February 1963. She operated with the 7th Fleet from April to November 1964, and with the Alaskan Sea Frontier from June to September 1965. In December 1965, the tug towed Bunker Hill (AVT-9) from San Francisco, California, to San Diego. This was the largest operational tow made by a tug of the Pacific Fleet — 33,946 long tons (34,491 t). She returned to Alaska from 8 February to 11 April 1967.

== Vietnam War operations ==
Tawasa's next deployment to the western Pacific placed the ship in a combat zone for the third time in her naval career. On 5 February 1968, she stood out of San Diego for San Francisco to pick up YFN-1126 and deliver the covered lighter to Hawaii. She left her charge at Pearl Harbor on 17 February 1968, and headed for the Philippine Islands the following week to provide target services for ships at Subic Bay until 13 April 1968 when she headed for Vietnam.

Tawasa arrived at Da Nang on 17 April 1968, and departed the next day for special operations that lasted for a month. She returned to Subic Bay on 21 May 1968 for a week and then steamed to Sattahip, Thailand, to provide drone services for the Royal Thai Navy. The tug called at Da Nang on 19 June 1968 and began special operations that lasted until 10 July 1968. Upon conclusion of the mission, the tug called at Hong Kong and Yokosuka, Japan, before returning to San Diego, California, on 26 August 1968. She entered the Campbell Machine Yard there the following month for an overhaul which lasted until 21 January 1969.

On 5 March 1969, Tawasa got underway for the Philippines and Vietnam. She called at Da Nang and then proceeded to "Yankee Station" for surveillance duty. The ship was relieved on 22 May 1969 and sailed, via Hong Kong, for Singapore. However, on 3 June 1969 the tug went to the assistance of destroyer Evans (DD-754) which had collided with the Australian aircraft carrier HMAS Melbourne (R21). Evans had been cut in two and only the stern section was afloat. Tawasa took the section in tow and returned it to Subic Bay before continuing on her original voyage. She was at Singapore on 16 June and 17 June 1969, and left for Vũng Tàu with YF-866 in tow. She dropped off the lighter on 19 June 1969, and picked up a repair barge the next day before proceeding via Subic Bay to Guam. After returning to Subic Bay on 8 July, Tawasa made two additional voyages to Vũng Tàu before returning to San Diego on 24 September 1969.

== North Pacific operations ==
Tawasa was deployed to the western Pacific again from 16 March to 4 October 1970, and from 8 November 1972 to 15 June 1973. In 1971, the tug deployed to Kodiak from July to November to serve as a search and rescue vessel.

== Final decommissioning ==
After returning to San Diego in 1973, Tawasa remained in California waters until 1 April 1975 when she was decommissioned and struck from the Navy List. She was sold for scrapping by the Defense Reutilization and Marketing Service (DRMS), 1 August 1976.

== Awards ==
Tawasa received three battle stars for World War II service:

- Gilbert Islands operation; 26 November to 8 December 1943
- Marshall Islands operation; Occupation of Kwajalein and Majuro Atolls, 31 January to 18 February 1944; Occupation of Eniwetok Atoll, 18 February to 2 March 1944
- Marianas operation; Assault and occupation of Saipan, 11 June to 7 July 1944

Two battle stars for Korean operations:

- Korean Defense Summer-Fall 1952; 19 July to 10 August 1952, 3 November to 30 November 1952
- Third Korean Winter; 1 December to 5 December 1952, 29 December 1952 to 3 January 1953

Seven campaign stars for Vietnam Crisis:

- Vietnamese Counteroffensive - Phase IV; 15 April to 20 May 1968, 30 May to 30 June 1968
- Vietnamese Counteroffensive - Phase V; 1 July to 13 July 1968
- Tet 69/Counteroffensive; 20 April to 24 May 1969, 2 June to 4 June 1969
- Vietnam Summer-Fall 1969; 13 June to 14 June 1969, 18 June to 21 June 1969, 25 July to 28 July 1969, 5 August to 7 August 1969
- Sanctuary Counteroffensive; 23 May to 26 May 1970, 18 June to 20 June 1970
- Vietnamese Counteroffensive - Phase VII; 30 July to 3 August 1970
- Consolidation II Consolidation II; 21 February to 28 March 1972
