= 1954 Soviet nuclear tests =

1954

Information
- Country: Soviet Union
- Test site: Ground Zero, Semipalatinsk, Kazakhstan; Orenburg, Russia
- Period: 1954
- Number of tests: 10
- Test type: air drop, atmospheric, dry surface, tower
- Max. yield: 62 kilotonnes of TNT (260 TJ)

Test series chronology

The Soviet Union's 1954 nuclear test series was a group of 10 nuclear tests conducted in 1954. These tests followed the 1953 Soviet nuclear tests series and preceded the 1955 Soviet nuclear tests series.

Soviet Union's 1954 series tests and detonations
Name (Note: The US, France and Great Britain have code-named their test events, while the USSR and China did not, and therefore have only test numbers (with some exceptions – Soviet peaceful explosions were named). Word translations into English in parentheses unless the name is a proper noun. A dash followed by a number indicates a member of a salvo event. The US also sometimes named the individual explosions in such a salvo test, which results in "name1 – 1(with name2)". If test is canceled or aborted, then the row data like date and location discloses the intended plans, where known.)	Date time (UT)	Local time zone (Note: To convert the UT time into standard local, add the number of hours in parentheses to the UT time; for local daylight saving time, add one additional hour. If the result is earlier than 00:00, add 24 hours and subtract 1 from the day; if it is 24:00 or later, subtract 24 hours and add 1 to the day. Historical time zone data obtained from the IANA time zone database.)	Location (Note: Rough place name and a latitude/longitude reference; for rocket-carried tests, the launch location is specified before the detonation location, if known. Some locations are extremely accurate; others (like airdrops and space blasts) may be quite inaccurate. "~" indicates a likely pro-forma rough location, shared with other tests in that same area.)	Elevation + height (Note: Elevation is the ground level at the point directly below the explosion relative to sea level; height is the additional distance added or subtracted by tower, balloon, shaft, tunnel, air drop or other contrivance. For rocket bursts the ground level is "N/A". In some cases it is not clear if the height is absolute or relative to ground, for example, Plumbbob/John. No number or units indicates the value is unknown, while "0" means zero. Sorting on this column is by elevation and height added together.)	Delivery, (Note: Atmospheric, airdrop, balloon, gun, cruise missile, rocket, surface, tower, and barge are all disallowed by the Partial Nuclear Test Ban Treaty. Sealed shaft and tunnel are underground, and remained useful under the PTBT. Intentional cratering tests are borderline; they occurred under the treaty, were sometimes protested, and generally overlooked if the test was declared to be a peaceful use.) Purpose (Note: Include weapons development, weapon effects, safety test, transport safety test, war, science, joint verification and industrial/peaceful, which may be further broken down.)	Device (Note: Designations for test items where known, "?" indicates some uncertainty about the preceding value, nicknames for particular devices in quotes. This category of information is often not officially disclosed.)	Yield (Note: Estimated energy yield in tons, kilotons, and megatons. A ton of TNT equivalent is defined as 4.184 gigajoules (1 gigacalorie).)	Fallout (Note: Radioactive emission to the atmosphere aside from prompt neutrons, where known. The measured species is only iodine-131 if mentioned, otherwise it is all species. No entry means unknown, probably none if underground and "all" if not; otherwise notation for whether measured on the site only or off the site, where known, and the measured amount of radioactivity released.)	References	Notes
9 (Joe 8)	14 September 1954 06:33:??	SVET (5 hrs)	Orenburg, Russia 52.64418°N 52.80547°E	+ 350 m (1,150 ft)	air drop, military exercise	RDS-3	40 kt			Detonation of a nuclear weapon as a part of a military exercise at Totsk, MoD test site, Orenburg Region to gain experience on nuclear warfare. Maneuvers by troops and armour near the hypocenter shortly afterwards.
10	29 September 1954	ALMT (6 hrs)	Ground Zero, Semipalatinsk, Kazakhstan ~ 50.4°N 77.8°E	280 m (920 ft) + 210 m (690 ft)	atmospheric, weapons development		200 t			
11	1 October 1954	ALMT (6 hrs)	Ground Zero, Semipalatinsk, Kazakhstan ~ 50.4°N 77.8°E	280 m (920 ft) + 105 m (344 ft)	atmospheric, weapons development		30 t			
12 (Joe 9)	3 October 1954	ALMT (6 hrs)	Ground Zero, Semipalatinsk, Kazakhstan ~ 50.4°N 77.8°E	280 m (920 ft) + 130 m (430 ft)	atmospheric, weapons development		2 kt			
13 (Joe 10)	5 October 1954 03:00:??	ALMT (6 hrs)	Ground Zero, Semipalatinsk, Kazakhstan 50.416°N 77.74°E	280 m (920 ft) + 0	dry surface, weapons development		4 kt			
14 (Joe 11)	8 October 1954	ALMT (6 hrs)	Ground Zero, Semipalatinsk, Kazakhstan ~ 50.4°N 77.8°E	280 m (920 ft) + 275 m (902 ft)	atmospheric, weapons development		800 t			
15	19 October 1954	ALMT (6 hrs)	Ground Zero, Semipalatinsk, Kazakhstan 50.372°N 77.825°E	280 m (920 ft) + 15 m (49 ft)	tower, weapons development	RDS-9/T-5	less than 0.001 kt			First Soviet fizzle. T-5 torpedo charge.
16 (Joe 12)	23 October 1954	ALMT (6 hrs)	Ground Zero, Semipalatinsk, Kazakhstan ~ 50.4°N 77.8°E	280 m (920 ft) + 410 m (1,350 ft)	atmospheric, weapons development	RDS-3I	62 kt			RDS-3 with improved initiator.
17 (Joe 13)	26 October 1954	ALMT (6 hrs)	Ground Zero, Semipalatinsk, Kazakhstan ~ 50.4°N 77.8°E	280 m (920 ft) + 110 m (360 ft)	atmospheric, weapons development		2.8 kt			
18 (Joe 14)	30 October 1954 04:00:??	ALMT (6 hrs)	Ground Zero, Semipalatinsk, Kazakhstan 50.416°N 77.74°E	280 m (920 ft) + 55 m (180 ft)	air drop, weapons development		10 kt			Air dropped bomb, but with a very low height of burst.
