= Operation Wigwam =

1955 U.S. nuclear test

- Wigwam test detonation.

Information
- Country: United States
- Test site: Pacific Ocean off California
- Period: 1955
- Number of tests: 1
- Test type: Underwater
- Max. yield: 30 kilotonnes of TNT (130 TJ)

Test series chronology

Video of the test—12 second intro

Operation Wigwam involved a single test of the Mark 90 "Betty" nuclear bomb. It was conducted between Operation Teapot and Project 56 on May 14, 1955, about 500 miles (800 km) southwest of San Diego, California. 6,800 personnel aboard 30 ships were involved in Wigwam. The purpose of Wigwam was to determine the vulnerability of submarines to deeply detonated nuclear weapons, and to evaluate the feasibility of using such weapons in a combat situation. The task force commander, Admiral John Sylvester, was embarked on the task force flagship USS Mount McKinley. Wigwam was the first atomic test in the deep ocean, and it remains the only test that has been conducted in water deeper than 1,000 ft (300 m).

== Detonation layout and test ==
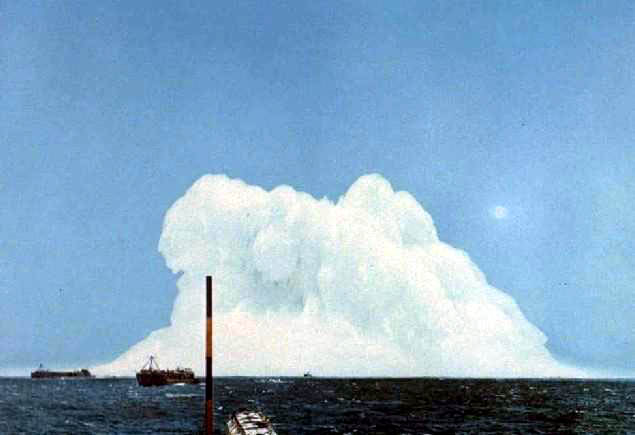
Wigwam test, 1955

The test device was suspended to a depth of 2,000 feet (610 m) by cable attached to a barge. A six-mile (ten-kilometer) tow line connected the 205-foot (62 m) Cherokee-class fleet tug, USS Tawasa, to the shot barge. Suspended from the tow lines of other tugs were three miniature unmanned target submarines designated "SQUAWS", each packed with cameras and telemetry instruments. Those targets were 132 ft 2.625 in (40.3 m) long, 4/5 scale of the SS-563 prototype hull (USS Tang (SS-563)) to assess effects of the explosion on a submarine hull.

The time of detonation was 13:00 local Pacific Time (noon Pacific Standard Time).

The equipment intended for direct measurement of the explosion-generated underwater bubble was not operational at the time of the shot, but based on other measurements, the bubble's maximum radius was calculated as 376 feet (115 m), and its pulsation period approximately 2.83 seconds.

== Underwater sound ==
The underwater sound from the Wigwam explosion was recorded on bottom-mounted hydrophones at Point Sur and Point Arena off California, and at Kāneʻohe Bay off Oahu, Hawaii. The sound emanating from the explosive test began as an intense water shock wave. As the sound traveled away from the test point, it reflected from topographic features, such as islands and seamounts, located throughout both the North and South Pacific Basins. The reflected sound was then recorded as hours-long sound sequences with varying intensity at Kaneohe and Point Sur. Some of the acoustic energy travelled round trip distances of over 12,000 miles (20,000 km). The sound signals provided one of the early measurements of underwater sound attenuation at low frequencies.

== Detonations ==
The detonations in the United States' Wigwam series are listed below:

United States' Wigwam series tests and detonations
Name (Note: The US, France and Great Britain have code-named their test events, while the USSR and China did not, and therefore have only test numbers (with some exceptions – Soviet peaceful explosions were named). Word translations into English in parentheses unless the name is a proper noun. A dash followed by a number indicates a member of a salvo event. The US also sometimes named the individual explosions in such a salvo test, which results in "name1 – 1(with name2)". If test is canceled or aborted, then the row data like date and location discloses the intended plans, where known.)	Date time (UT)	Local time zone (Note: To convert the UT time into standard local, add the number of hours in parentheses to the UT time; for local daylight saving time, add one additional hour. If the result is earlier than 00:00, add 24 hours and subtract 1 from the day; if it is 24:00 or later, subtract 24 hours and add 1 to the day. Historical time zone data obtained from the IANA time zone database.)	Location (Note: Rough place name and a latitude/longitude reference; for rocket-carried tests, the launch location is specified before the detonation location, if known. Some locations are extremely accurate; others (like airdrops and space blasts) may be quite inaccurate. "~" indicates a likely pro-forma rough location, shared with other tests in that same area.)	Elevation + height (Note: Elevation is the ground level at the point directly below the explosion relative to sea level; height is the additional distance added or subtracted by tower, balloon, shaft, tunnel, air drop or other contrivance. For rocket bursts the ground level is "N/A". In some cases it is not clear if the height is absolute or relative to ground, for example, Plumbbob/John. No number or units indicates the value is unknown, while "0" means zero. Sorting on this column is by elevation and height added together.)	Delivery, (Note: Atmospheric, airdrop, balloon, gun, cruise missile, rocket, surface, tower, and barge are all disallowed by the Partial Nuclear Test Ban Treaty. Sealed shaft and tunnel are underground, and remained useful under the PTBT. Intentional cratering tests are borderline; they occurred under the treaty, were sometimes protested, and generally overlooked if the test was declared to be a peaceful use.) Purpose (Note: Include weapons development, weapon effects, safety test, transport safety test, war, science, joint verification and industrial/peaceful, which may be further broken down.)	Device (Note: Designations for test items where known, "?" indicates some uncertainty about the preceding value, nicknames for particular devices in quotes. This category of information is often not officially disclosed.)	Yield (Note: Estimated energy yield in tons, kilotons, and megatons. A ton of TNT equivalent is defined as 4.184 gigajoules (1 gigacalorie).)	Fallout (Note: Radioactive emission to the atmosphere aside from prompt neutrons, where known. The measured species is only iodine-131 if mentioned, otherwise it is all species. No entry means unknown, probably none if underground and "all" if not; otherwise notation for whether measured on the site only or off the site, where known, and the measured amount of radioactivity released.)	References	Notes
Wigwam	May 14, 1955 20:00:00.0	PST (−8 hrs)	Pacific Ocean off California 28.7333°N 126.2667°W	0–610 m (2,000 ft)	underwater, weapon effect	Mk-90 B7 "Betty" depth bomb	30 kt			Deep water nuclear depth bomb to test ability to damage submarines.

== See also ==
- List of United States' nuclear weapons tests
- Operation Crossroads
