= 1958 Soviet nuclear tests =

1958
- Nuclear blast animation

Information
- Country: Soviet Union
- Test site: Ground Zero, Semipalatinsk, Kazakhstan; NZ Area C, Sukhoy Nos, Novaya Zemlya, Russia; Western Kazakhstan
- Period: 1958
- Number of tests: 36
- Test type: air drop, atmospheric, high alt rocket (30–80 km)
- Max. yield: 2.9 megatonnes of TNT (12 PJ)

Test series chronology

The Soviet Union's 1958 nuclear test series was a group of 36 nuclear tests conducted in 1958. These tests followed the 1957 Soviet nuclear tests series and preceded the 1961 Soviet nuclear tests series.

Soviet Union's 1958 series tests and detonations
| Name (Note: The US, France and Great Britain have code-named their test events, while the USSR and China did not, and therefore have only test numbers (with some exceptions – Soviet peaceful explosions were named). Word translations into English in parentheses unless the name is a proper noun. A dash followed by a number indicates a member of a salvo event. The US also sometimes named the individual explosions in such a salvo test, which results in "name1 – 1(with name2)". If test is canceled or aborted, then the row data like date and location discloses the intended plans, where known.) | Date time (UT) | Local time zone (Note: To convert the UT time into standard local, add the number of hours in parentheses to the UT time; for local daylight saving time, add one additional hour. If the result is earlier than 00:00, add 24 hours and subtract 1 from the day; if it is 24:00 or later, subtract 24 hours and add 1 to the day. Historical time zone data obtained from the IANA time zone database.) | Location (Note: Rough place name and a latitude/longitude reference; for rocket-carried tests, the launch location is specified before the detonation location, if known. Some locations are extremely accurate; others (like airdrops and space blasts) may be quite inaccurate. "~" indicates a likely pro-forma rough location, shared with other tests in that same area.) | Elevation + height (Note: Elevation is the ground level at the point directly below the explosion relative to sea level; height is the additional distance added or subtracted by tower, balloon, shaft, tunnel, air drop or other contrivance. For rocket bursts the ground level is "N/A". In some cases it is not clear if the height is absolute or relative to ground, for example, Plumbbob/John. No number or units indicates the value is unknown, while "0" means zero. Sorting on this column is by elevation and height added together.) | Delivery, (Note: Atmospheric, airdrop, balloon, gun, cruise missile, rocket, surface, tower, and barge are all disallowed by the Partial Nuclear Test Ban Treaty. Sealed shaft and tunnel are underground, and remained useful under the PTBT. Intentional cratering tests are borderline; they occurred under the treaty, were sometimes protested, and generally overlooked if the test was declared to be a peaceful use.) Purpose (Note: Include weapons development, weapon effects, safety test, transport safety test, war, science, joint verification and industrial/peaceful, which may be further broken down.) | Device (Note: Designations for test items where known, "?" indicates some uncertainty about the preceding value, nicknames for particular devices in quotes. This category of information is often not officially disclosed.) | Yield (Note: Estimated energy yield in tons, kilotons, and megatons. A ton of TNT equivalent is defined as 4.184 gigajoules (1 gigacalorie).) | Fallout (Note: Radioactive emission to the atmosphere aside from prompt neutrons, where known. The measured species is only iodine-131 if mentioned, otherwise it is all species. No entry means unknown, probably none if underground and "all" if not; otherwise notation for whether measured on the site only or off the site, where known, and the measured amount of radioactivity released.) | References | Notes |
|---|---|---|---|---|---|---|---|---|---|---|
| 50 (Joe 44) | 4 January 1958 | ALMT (6 hrs) | Ground Zero, Semipalatinsk, Kazakhstan ~ 50.4°N 77.8°E | 280 m (920 ft) + 400 m (1,300 ft) | air drop, weapons development | | 1.3 kt | | | |
| 51 (Joe 45) | 17 January 1958 | ALMT (6 hrs) | Ground Zero, Semipalatinsk, Kazakhstan ~ 50.4°N 77.8°E | N/A + 500 m (1,600 ft) | atmospheric, weapons development | | 500 t | | | |
| 52 (Joe 46) | 23 February 1958 | MSK (3 hrs) | NZ Area C, Sukhoy Nos, Novaya Zemlya, Russia 74.3°N 53.8°E | 0 + 2,500 m (8,200 ft) | air drop, weapons development | Product-49 TN R-12 Dvina Missile warhead | 860 kt | | | |
| 53 (Joe 47) | 27 February 1958 07:59:?? | MSK (3 hrs) | NZ Area C, Sukhoy Nos, Novaya Zemlya, Russia 74.4°N 53.6°E | 0 + 2,500 m (8,200 ft) | air drop, weapons development | TN | 250 kt | | | |
| 54 (Joe 48) | 27 February 1958 10:24:?? | MSK (3 hrs) | NZ Area C, Sukhoy Nos, Novaya Zemlya, Russia 74.3°N 54°E | 0 + | air drop, weapons development | Product-255 TN R-13 warhead | 1.5 Mt | | | |
| 55 (Joe 49) | 13 March 1958 | ALMT (6 hrs) | Ground Zero, Semipalatinsk, Kazakhstan ~ 50.4°N 77.8°E | 280 m (920 ft) + 475 m (1,558 ft) | air drop, weapons development | | 1.2 kt | | | |
| unnumbered #2 | 13 March 1958 | ALMT (6 hrs) | Ground Zero, Semipalatinsk, Kazakhstan ~ 50.4°N 77.8°E | 280 m (920 ft) + | atmospheric, | | less than 0.001 kt | | | |
| 56 (Joe 51) | 14 March 1958 | ALMT (6 hrs) | Ground Zero, Semipalatinsk, Kazakhstan ~ 50.4°N 77.8°E | 280 m (920 ft) + 1,030 m (3,380 ft) | air drop, weapons development | | 35 kt | | | |
| 57 (Joe 50) | 14 March 1958 | MSK (3 hrs) | NZ Area C, Sukhoy Nos, Novaya Zemlya, Russia 74.25°N 54.33°E | 0 + | air drop, fundamental science | | 40 kt | | | |
| 58 (Joe 52) | 15 March 1958 | ALMT (6 hrs) | Ground Zero, Semipalatinsk, Kazakhstan ~ 50.4°N 77.8°E | 280 m (920 ft) + 965 m (3,166 ft) | air drop, weapons development | | 14 kt | | | |
| unnumbered #3 | 15 March 1958 | ALMT (6 hrs) | Ground Zero, Semipalatinsk, Kazakhstan ~ 50.4°N 77.8°E | 280 m (920 ft) + | atmospheric, | | no yield | | | |
| 59 | 18 March 1958 | ALMT (6 hrs) | Ground Zero, Semipalatinsk, Kazakhstan ~ 50.4°N 77.8°E | 280 m (920 ft) + 290 m (950 ft) | air drop, fundamental science | | 160 t | | | |
| 60 (Joe 53) | 20 March 1958 | ALMT (6 hrs) | Ground Zero, Semipalatinsk, Kazakhstan ~ 50.4°N 77.8°E | 280 m (920 ft) + 1,015 m (3,330 ft) | air drop, weapons development | | 12 kt | | | |
| 61 (Joe 54) | 21 March 1958 | MSK (3 hrs) | NZ Area C, Sukhoy Nos, Novaya Zemlya, Russia 74°N 60°E | 0 + 2,500 m (8,200 ft) | air drop, weapons development | Product-49 TN R-12 Missile warhead | 650 kt | | | |
| 62 (Joe 55) | 22 March 1958 | ALMT (6 hrs) | Ground Zero, Semipalatinsk, Kazakhstan ~ 50.4°N 77.8°E | 280 m (920 ft) + 1,415 m (4,642 ft) | air drop, weapons development | | 18 kt | | | |
| 63 (Joe 56) | 30 September 1958 07:50:?? | MSK (3 hrs) | NZ Area C, Sukhoy Nos, Novaya Zemlya, Russia 73.75°N 54.75°E | 0 + 1,500 m (4,900 ft) | air drop, weapons development | Product-49 TN R-12 Dvina missile warhead | 1.2 Mt | | | |
| 64 (Joe 57) | 30 September 1958 09:55:?? | MSK (3 hrs) | NZ Area C, Sukhoy Nos, Novaya Zemlya, Russia 73.4°N 55°E | 0 + 2,500 m (8,200 ft) | air drop, weapons development | Product-49 TN R-12 missile warhead | 900 kt | | | |
| 65 (Joe 58) | 2 October 1958 08:00:?? | MSK (3 hrs) | NZ Area C, Sukhoy Nos, Novaya Zemlya, Russia ~ 73°N 55°E | 0 + 1,620 m (5,310 ft) | atmospheric, weapons development | TN | 290 kt | | | |
| 66 (Joe 59) | 2 October 1958 09:01:?? | MSK (3 hrs) | NZ Area C, Sukhoy Nos, Novaya Zemlya, Russia 73.63°N 57.5°E | 0 + | atmospheric, fundamental science | | 40 kt | | | |
| 67 (Joe 60) | 4 October 1958 | MSK (3 hrs) | NZ Area C, Sukhoy Nos, Novaya Zemlya, Russia ~ 73°N 55°E | 0 + 800 m (2,600 ft) | atmospheric, weapons development | | 9 kt | | | |
| 68 (Joe 61) | 5 October 1958 06:00:?? | MSK (3 hrs) | NZ Area C, Sukhoy Nos, Novaya Zemlya, Russia ~ 73°N 55°E | 0 + 1,200 m (3,900 ft) | atmospheric, weapons development | | 15 kt | | | |
| 69 (Joe 62) | 6 October 1958 | MSK (3 hrs) | NZ Area C, Sukhoy Nos, Novaya Zemlya, Russia ~ 73°N 55°E | 0 + 1,200 m (3,900 ft) | air drop, weapons development | | 5.5 kt | | | |
| 70 (Joe 63) | 10 October 1958 07:51:?? | MSK (3 hrs) | NZ Area C, Sukhoy Nos, Novaya Zemlya, Russia 73.63°N 54.25°E | 0 + | air drop, weapons development | TN | 68 kt | | | |
| 71 (Joe 64) | 12 October 1958 07:53:34 | MSK (3 hrs) | NZ Area C, Sukhoy Nos, Novaya Zemlya, Russia 74.93°N 53.32°E | 0 + | air drop, weapons development | Product-255 TN R-13 missile warhead | 1.5 Mt | | | |
| 72 (Joe 65) | 15 October 1958 07:51:14 | MSK (3 hrs) | NZ Area C, Sukhoy Nos, Novaya Zemlya, Russia 74°N 51.8°E | 0 + 2,150 m (7,050 ft) | air drop, weapons development | Product-255 TN R-13 Missile warhead | 1.5 Mt | | | |
| 73 (Joe 66) | 18 October 1958 09:51:06 | MSK (3 hrs) | NZ Area C, Sukhoy Nos, Novaya Zemlya, Russia 73.97°N 52.47°E | 0 + | air drop, weapons development | RDS-46 TN R-7 Semyorka missile warhead | 2.9 Mt | | | |
| 75 (Joe 67) | 19 October 1958 | MSK (3 hrs) | NZ Area C, Sukhoy Nos, Novaya Zemlya, Russia ~ 73°N 55°E | 0 + 900 m (3,000 ft) | air drop, weapons development | | less than 0.001 kt | | | |
| 74 | 19 October 1958 07:27:?? | MSK (3 hrs) | NZ Area C, Sukhoy Nos, Novaya Zemlya, Russia ~ 73°N 55°E | 0 + | air drop, fundamental science | | 40 kt | | | A fizzle. |
| 76 (Joe 68) | 20 October 1958 08:20:?? | MSK (3 hrs) | NZ Area C, Sukhoy Nos, Novaya Zemlya, Russia 73.58°N 54.3°E | 0 + | air drop, weapons development | TN | 440 kt | | | |
| 77 (Joe 69) | 21 October 1958 | MSK (3 hrs) | NZ Area C, Sukhoy Nos, Novaya Zemlya, Russia ~ 73°N 55°E | 0 + 570 m (1,870 ft) | air drop, weapons development | | 2 kt | | | |
| 78 (Joe 70) | 22 October 1958 08:21:04 | MSK (3 hrs) | NZ Area C, Sukhoy Nos, Novaya Zemlya, Russia 73.53°N 53.1°E | 0 + 2,070 m (6,790 ft) | air drop, weapons development | RDS-46 TN R-7 Missile warhead | 2.8 Mt | | | |
| 79 (Joe 71) | 24 October 1958 08:03:06 | MSK (3 hrs) | NZ Area C, Sukhoy Nos, Novaya Zemlya, Russia 73.68°N 54.97°E | 0 + 1,525 m (5,003 ft) | air drop, weapons development | Product-49 TN R-12 missile warhead | 1 Mt | | | |
| 81 | 25 October 1958 | MSK (3 hrs) | NZ Area C, Sukhoy Nos, Novaya Zemlya, Russia ~ 73°N 55°E | 0 + 300 m (980 ft) | air drop, fundamental science | | 50 t | | | |
| 80 (Joe 72) | 25 October 1958 08:20:?? | MSK (3 hrs) | NZ Area C, Sukhoy Nos, Novaya Zemlya, Russia 74°N 55°E | 0 + 1,500 m (4,900 ft) | air drop, weapons development | TN | 190 kt | | | |
| 82 (Joe 73) | 1 November 1958 | URAT (5 hrs) | Launch from Kapustin Yar, Astrakhan 48.56956°N 45.90346°E, elv: 0 + 0 m (0 + 0 ft); Detonation over Western Kazakhstan ~ 49.3°N 48°E | N/A + 12 kilometres (7.5 mi) | high alt rocket (30–80 km), weapon effect | | 10 kt | | | Fired after agreed upon end of testing, caused Eisenhower to formally abrogate unilateral test ban, but US maintained ban anyway. R-5M rocket. |
| 83 (Joe 74) | 3 November 1958 | URAT (5 hrs) | Launch from Kapustin Yar, Astrakhan 48.56956°N 45.90346°E, elv: 0 + 0 m (0 + 0 ft); Detonation over Western Kazakhstan ~ 49.3°N 48°E | N/A + 12 kilometres (7.5 mi) | high alt rocket (30–80 km), weapon effect | | 10 kt | | | Fired after agreed upon end of testing, caused Eisenhower to formally abrogate unilateral test ban, but US maintained ban anyway. R-5M rocket. |
