= 1956 Soviet nuclear tests =

1956

Information
- Country: Soviet Union
- Test site: Ground Zero, Semipalatinsk, Kazakhstan; Kyzylorda, Kazakhstan
- Period: 1956
- Number of tests: 9
- Test type: air drop, dry surface, high alt rocket (30–80 km), tower
- Max. yield: 900 kilotonnes of TNT (3,800 TJ)

Test series chronology

The Soviet Union's 1956 nuclear test series was a group of 9 nuclear tests conducted in 1956. These tests followed the 1955 Soviet nuclear tests series and preceded the 1957 Soviet nuclear tests series.

Soviet Union's 1956 series tests and detonations
| Name (Note: The US, France and Great Britain have code-named their test events, while the USSR and China did not, and therefore have only test numbers (with some exceptions – Soviet peaceful explosions were named). Word translations into English in parentheses unless the name is a proper noun. A dash followed by a number indicates a member of a salvo event. The US also sometimes named the individual explosions in such a salvo test, which results in "name1 – 1(with name2)". If test is canceled or aborted, then the row data like date and location discloses the intended plans, where known.) | Date time (UT) | Local time zone (Note: To convert the UT time into standard local, add the number of hours in parentheses to the UT time; for local daylight saving time, add one additional hour. If the result is earlier than 00:00, add 24 hours and subtract 1 from the day; if it is 24:00 or later, subtract 24 hours and add 1 to the day.) | Location (Note: Rough place name and a latitude/longitude reference; for rocket-carried tests, the launch location is specified before the detonation location, if known. Some locations are extremely accurate; others (like airdrops and space blasts) may be quite inaccurate. "~" indicates a likely pro-forma rough location, shared with other tests in that same area.) | Elevation + height (Note: Elevation is the ground level at the point directly below the explosion relative to sea level; height is the additional distance added or subtracted by tower, balloon, shaft, tunnel, air drop or other contrivance. For rocket bursts the ground level is "N/A". In some cases it is not clear if the height is absolute or relative to ground, for example, Plumbbob/John. No number or units indicates the value is unknown, while "0" means zero. Sorting on this column is by elevation and height added together.) | Delivery, (Note: Atmospheric, airdrop, balloon, gun, cruise missile, rocket, surface, tower, and barge are all disallowed by the Partial Nuclear Test Ban Treaty. Sealed shaft and tunnel are underground, and remained useful under the PTBT. Intentional cratering tests are borderline; they occurred under the treaty, were sometimes protested, and generally overlooked if the test was declared to be a peaceful use.) Purpose (Note: Include weapons development, weapon effects, safety test, transport safety test, war, science, joint verification and industrial/peaceful, which may be further broken down.) | Device (Note: Designations for test items where known, "?" indicates some uncertainty about the preceding value, nicknames for particular devices in quotes. This category of information is often not officially disclosed.) | Yield (Note: Estimated energy yield in tons, kilotons, and megatons. A ton of TNT equivalent is defined as 4.184 gigajoules (1 gigacalorie).) | Fallout (Note: Radioactive emission to the atmosphere aside from prompt neutrons, where known. The measured species is only iodine-131 if mentioned, otherwise it is all species. No entry means unknown, probably none if underground and "all" if not; otherwise notation for whether measured on the site only or off the site, where known, and the measured amount of radioactivity released.) | References | Notes |
|---|---|---|---|---|---|---|---|---|---|---|
| 25 Baykal (Joe 20) | 2 February 1956 | KIZT (5 hrs) | Launch from Kapustin Yar, Astrakhan 48.56956°N 45.90346°E, elv: 0 + 0 m (0 + 0 ft); Detonation over Kyzylorda, Kazakhstan 47.984°N 62.011°E | N/A + 0 | high alt rocket (30–80 km), weapon effect | | 300 t | | | Full-scale test of R-5M rocket launched in Kapustin Yar, targeted near Priaralsk Karakum, Kazakhstan. A fizzle. |
| 26 (Joe 21) | 16 March 1956 05:00:?? | ALMT (6 hrs) | Ground Zero, Semipalatinsk, Kazakhstan ~ 50.4°N 77.8°E | 280 m (920 ft) + 0 | dry surface, weapons development | | 14 kt | | | |
| 27 (Joe 22) | 25 March 1956 | ALMT (6 hrs) | Ground Zero, Semipalatinsk, Kazakhstan ~ 50.4°N 77.8°E | 280 m (920 ft) + 1 m (3 ft 3 in) | dry surface, weapons development | | 5.5 kt | | | |
| 28 (Joe 23) | 24 August 1956 00:15:?? | ALMT (6 hrs) | Ground Zero, Semipalatinsk, Kazakhstan 50.456°N 77.773°E | 280 m (920 ft) + 93 m (305 ft) | tower, weapons development | | 27 kt | | | |
| 29 (Joe 24) | 30 August 1956 | ALMT (6 hrs) | Ground Zero, Semipalatinsk, Kazakhstan 50.42°N 77.78°E | 280 m (920 ft) + 1,100 m (3,600 ft) | air drop, weapons development | TN | 900 kt | | | |
| 30 (Joe 25) | 2 September 1956 | ALMT (6 hrs) | Ground Zero, Semipalatinsk, Kazakhstan ~ 50.4°N 77.8°E | 280 m (920 ft) + 1,050 m (3,440 ft) | air drop, weapons development | | 51 kt | | | |
| 31 (Joe 26) | 10 September 1956 | ALMT (6 hrs) | Ground Zero, Semipalatinsk, Kazakhstan ~ 50.4°N 77.8°E | 280 m (920 ft) + 340 m (1,120 ft) | air drop, weapons development | | 38 kt | | | |
| 32 (Joe 27) | 17 November 1956 | ALMT (6 hrs) | Ground Zero, Semipalatinsk, Kazakhstan 50.42°N 77.78°E | 280 m (920 ft) + 2,000 m (6,600 ft) | air drop, weapons development | TN | 900 kt | | | |
| 33 (Joe 28) | 14 December 1956 | ALMT (6 hrs) | Ground Zero, Semipalatinsk, Kazakhstan ~ 50.4°N 77.8°E | 280 m (920 ft) + 1,965 m (6,447 ft) | air drop, weapons development | | 40 kt | | | |
