= 1961 Soviet nuclear tests =

1961

Information
- Country: Soviet Union
- Test site: Degelen, Semipalatinsk, Kazakhstan; Ground Zero, Semipalatinsk, Kazakhstan; Kapustin Yar, Astrakhan; NZ Area A, Chyornaya Guba, Novaya Zemlya, Russia; NZ Area C, Sukhoy Nos, Novaya Zemlya, Russia
- Period: 1961
- Number of tests: 57
- Test type: air drop, atmospheric, barge, cruise missile, dry surface, high alt rocket (30–80 km), parachuted, tunnel, underwater
- Max. yield: 50 megatonnes of TNT (210 PJ)

Test series chronology

The Soviet Union's 1961 nuclear test series was a group of 57 nuclear tests conducted in 1961. These tests followed the 1958 Soviet nuclear tests series and preceded the Soviet Project K nuclear tests series.

Soviet Union's 1961 series tests and detonations
Name (Note: The US, France and Great Britain have code-named their test events, while the USSR and China did not, and therefore have only test numbers (with some exceptions – Soviet peaceful explosions were named). Word translations into English in parentheses unless the name is a proper noun. A dash followed by a number indicates a member of a salvo event. The US also sometimes named the individual explosions in such a salvo test, which results in "name1 – 1(with name2)". If test is canceled or aborted, then the row data like date and location discloses the intended plans, where known.)	Date time (UT)	Local time zone (Note: To convert the UT time into standard local, add the number of hours in parentheses to the UT time; for local daylight saving time, add one additional hour. If the result is earlier than 00:00, add 24 hours and subtract 1 from the day; if it is 24:00 or later, subtract 24 hours and add 1 to the day. Historical time zone data obtained from the IANA time zone database.)	Location (Note: Rough place name and a latitude/longitude reference; for rocket-carried tests, the launch location is specified before the detonation location, if known. Some locations are extremely accurate; others (like airdrops and space blasts) may be quite inaccurate. "~" indicates a likely pro-forma rough location, shared with other tests in that same area.)	Elevation + height (Note: Elevation is the ground level at the point directly below the explosion relative to sea level; height is the additional distance added or subtracted by tower, balloon, shaft, tunnel, air drop or other contrivance. For rocket bursts the ground level is "N/A". In some cases it is not clear if the height is absolute or relative to ground, for example, Plumbbob/John. No number or units indicates the value is unknown, while "0" means zero. Sorting on this column is by elevation and height added together.)	Delivery, (Note: Atmospheric, airdrop, balloon, gun, cruise missile, rocket, surface, tower, and barge are all disallowed by the Partial Nuclear Test Ban Treaty. Sealed shaft and tunnel are underground, and remained useful under the PTBT. Intentional cratering tests are borderline; they occurred under the treaty, were sometimes protested, and generally overlooked if the test was declared to be a peaceful use.) Purpose (Note: Include weapons development, weapon effects, safety test, transport safety test, war, science, joint verification and industrial/peaceful, which may be further broken down.)	Device (Note: Designations for test items where known, "?" indicates some uncertainty about the preceding value, nicknames for particular devices in quotes. This category of information is often not officially disclosed.)	Yield (Note: Estimated energy yield in tons, kilotons, and megatons. A ton of TNT equivalent is defined as 4.184 gigajoules (1 gigacalorie).)	Fallout (Note: Radioactive emission to the atmosphere aside from prompt neutrons, where known. The measured species is only iodine-131 if mentioned, otherwise it is all species. No entry means unknown, probably none if underground and "all" if not; otherwise notation for whether measured on the site only or off the site, where known, and the measured amount of radioactivity released.)	References	Notes
84 (Joe 75)	1 September 1961	ALMT (6 hrs)	Ground Zero, Semipalatinsk, Kazakhstan ~ 50.4227°N 77.7231°E	280 m (920 ft) + 660 m (2,170 ft)	air drop, weapons development		16 kt			
85 (Joe 76)	4 September 1961 05:00:27	ALMT (6 hrs)	Ground Zero, Semipalatinsk, Kazakhstan ~ 50.45°N 77.74°E	280 m (920 ft) + 725 m (2,379 ft)	air drop, weapons development		9 kt			
86 (Joe 77)	5 September 1961 06:00:05	ALMT (6 hrs)	Ground Zero, Semipalatinsk, Kazakhstan ~ 50.45°N 77.74°E	280 m (920 ft) + 710 m (2,330 ft)	air drop, weapons development		16 kt			
87 (Joe 78)	6 September 1961	ALMT (6 hrs)	Ground Zero, Semipalatinsk, Kazakhstan ~ 50.4°N 77.8°E	280 m (920 ft) + 685 m (2,247 ft)	air drop, weapons development		1.1 kt			Study of weapon effects on radar.
88 Groza (Storm) (Joe 79)	6 September 1961	MSK (3 hrs)	Launch from Kapustin Yar, Astrakhan 48.56956°N 45.90346°E, elv: 0 + 0 m (0 + 0 ft); Detonation over Kapustin Yar, Astrakhan 48.4°N 45.8°E	N/A + 22.7 kilometres (14.1 mi)	high alt rocket (30–80 km), weapon effect	R-12?	10.5 kt			R-5M rocket launch from Kapustin Yar. Probable ABM test.
89	9 September 1961	ALMT (6 hrs)	Ground Zero, Semipalatinsk, Kazakhstan ~ 50.378°N 77.855°E	280 m (920 ft) + 0	dry surface, safety experiment		380 t			
92 (Joe 81)	10 September 1961	ALMT (6 hrs)	Ground Zero, Semipalatinsk, Kazakhstan ~ 50°N 78°E	N/A + 180 m (590 ft)	atmospheric, weapons development		880 t			
90 Vozduj (Air) (Joe 80)	10 September 1961 09:00:09.2	MSK (3 hrs)	NZ Area C, Sukhoy Nos, Novaya Zemlya, Russia ~ 73.75°N 54.3°E	0 + 2,000 m (6,600 ft)	air drop, weapons development		2.7 Mt			Dropped by TU-95 from Olenya AF in the Kola Peninsula. Dropped over Battlefield D-2, near Mityushika Bay.
91 (Joe 82)	10 September 1961 11:00:??	MSK (3 hrs)	Launch from NZ Area A, Chyornaya Guba, Novaya Zemlya, Russia 71.61667°N 52.47833°E, elv: 30 + 0 m (98 + 0 ft); Detonation over NZ Area A, Chyornaya Guba, Novaya Zemlya, Russia 70.7°N 54.6°E	N/A + 390 m (1,280 ft)	high alt rocket (30–80 km), weapons development		12 kt			Launched on R-11M. Named "Volga" in one source, not connected with Volga series later on.
93	11 September 1961	ALMT (6 hrs)	Ground Zero, Semipalatinsk, Kazakhstan ~ 50.4°N 77.8°E	280 m (920 ft) + 690 m (2,260 ft)	air drop, weapons development		300 t			R-12 missile from Novaya Zemlya.
94 Roza1 (Rose) (Joe 83)	12 September 1961 10:08:15.3	MSK (3 hrs)	Launch from Komi, Russia 67.46441°N 64.30266°E, elv: 0 + 0 m (0 + 0 ft); Detonation over NZ Area C, Sukhoy Nos, Novaya Zemlya, Russia 74.2°N 52.1°E	N/A + 1,190 m (3,900 ft)	high alt rocket (30–80 km), weapons development	Product 49 TN	1.2 Mt			R-13 launched from Vorkuta Sovietski Air base. Probable ABM test. Airburst over water in Mitushika Bay.
95 (Joe 85)	13 September 1961	MSK (3 hrs)	Launch from Kola Peninsula Launch Area (Barents Sea) 70°N 40°E, elv: 0–30 m (0–98 ft); Detonation over NZ Area A, Chyornaya Guba, Novaya Zemlya, Russia 70.87°N 53.33°E	N/A + 250 m (820 ft)	high alt rocket (30–80 km), weapons development		6 kt			Live nuclear tipped missile test, across the sea to land.
96 (Joe 84)	13 September 1961 05:01:55.8	ALMT (6 hrs)	Ground Zero, Semipalatinsk, Kazakhstan ~ 50.45°N 77.75°E	280 m (920 ft) + 710 m (2,330 ft)	air drop, weapons development		10 kt			
97	14 September 1961 05:59:59.4	ALMT (6 hrs)	Ground Zero, Semipalatinsk, Kazakhstan 50.35°N 77.82°E	280 m (920 ft) + 0	dry surface, weapons development		400 t			
98 (Joe 86)	14 September 1961 09:56:16.7	MSK (3 hrs)	Launch from Kola Peninsula Launch Area (Barents Sea) 70.5°N 39.5°E, elv: 0–30 m (0–98 ft); Detonation over NZ Area C, Sukhoy Nos, Novaya Zemlya, Russia 74.6°N 51.1°E	N/A + 1,700 m (5,600 ft)	high alt rocket (30–80 km), weapons development		1.2 Mt			Kola Sea to Mitskuya Bay, R-13 ballistic missile live test.
99 Roza2 (Rose) (Joe 87)	16 September 1961 09:08:13.7	MSK (3 hrs)	Launch from Komi, Russia 67.46441°N 64.30266°E, elv: 0 + 0 m (0 + 0 ft); Detonation over NZ Area C, Sukhoy Nos, Novaya Zemlya, Russia ~ 73.75°N 54.3°E	N/A + 1,320 m (4,330 ft)	high alt rocket (30–80 km), weapons development	Product 49 TN	830 kt			Launched on an R-12 rocket from Vorkuta Sovietski Air base. Probable ABM test. One source says launch from Kola.
100 (Joe 88)	17 September 1961 07:00:46.6	ALMT (6 hrs)	Ground Zero, Semipalatinsk, Kazakhstan ~ 50.45°N 77.75°E	280 m (920 ft) + 695 m (2,280 ft)	air drop, weapons development		21 kt			
102	18 September 1961	ALMT (6 hrs)	Ground Zero, Semipalatinsk, Kazakhstan ~ 50.378°N 77.855°E	280 m (920 ft) + 1 m (3 ft 3 in)	dry surface, safety experiment		4 t			
103	18 September 1961	ALMT (6 hrs)	Ground Zero, Semipalatinsk, Kazakhstan ~ 50.4°N 77.8°E	N/A +	atmospheric, weapons development		750 t			
101 (Joe 89)	18 September 1961 07:59:36.8	MSK (3 hrs)	NZ Area C, Sukhoy Nos, Novaya Zemlya, Russia ~ 73.75°N 54.3°E	0 + 1,500 m (4,900 ft)	air drop, weapons development		1 Mt			Khalturin believes this is a missile test from Chita.
104 (Joe 90)	19 September 1961	ALMT (6 hrs)	Ground Zero, Semipalatinsk, Kazakhstan 50.3782°N 77.8373°E	280 m (920 ft) + 0	dry surface, safety experiment		30 t			
105	20 September 1961	ALMT (6 hrs)	Ground Zero, Semipalatinsk, Kazakhstan ~ 50.4°N 77.8°E	280 m (920 ft) + 280 m (920 ft)	air drop, weapons development		4.8 kt			
106 Volga1 (Joe 91)	20 September 1961 08:12:12	MSK (3 hrs)	Launch from NZ Area A, Chyornaya Guba, Novaya Zemlya, Russia 71.61667°N 52.47833°E, elv: 30 + 0 m (98 + 0 ft); Detonation over NZ Area C, Sukhoy Nos, Novaya Zemlya, Russia ~ 73.52°N 54.3°E	N/A + 1,600 m (5,200 ft)	high alt rocket (30–80 km), weapons development		1.5 Mt			Launched on R-11M rocket launched from Rogachevo airbase in the NTR. Probable ABM test.
107 (Joe 92)	21 September 1961 14:01:01.6	ALMT (6 hrs)	Ground Zero, Semipalatinsk, Kazakhstan ~ 50.4277°N 77.7231°E	280 m (920 ft) + 110 m (360 ft)	air drop, weapons development		800 t			
108 Volga2 (Joe 93)	22 September 1961 08:11:00	MSK (3 hrs)	Launch from NZ Area A, Chyornaya Guba, Novaya Zemlya, Russia 71.61667°N 52.47833°E, elv: 30 + 0 m (98 + 0 ft); Detonation over NZ Area C, Sukhoy Nos, Novaya Zemlya, Russia ~ 73.52°N 54.3°E	N/A + 1,300 m (4,300 ft)	high alt rocket (30–80 km), weapons development		260 kt			Launched on R-11M rocket launched from Rogachevo airbase in the NTR. Probable ABM test.
109	26 September 1961 07:01:19.8	ALMT (6 hrs)	Ground Zero, Semipalatinsk, Kazakhstan ~ 50.45°N 77.75°E	280 m (920 ft) + 665 m (2,182 ft)	air drop, weapons development		1.2 kt			
110	1 October 1961	ALMT (6 hrs)	Ground Zero, Semipalatinsk, Kazakhstan ~ 50.4°N 77.8°E	280 m (920 ft) + 700 m (2,300 ft)	air drop, weapons development		3 kt			
111 (Joe 94)	2 October 1961 10:30:50	MSK (3 hrs)	NZ Area C, Sukhoy Nos, Novaya Zemlya, Russia 73.92°N 54.55°E	0 + 1,500 m (4,900 ft)	air drop, weapons development		250 kt			
112 (Joe 95)	4 October 1961 07:01:19.9	ALMT (6 hrs)	Ground Zero, Semipalatinsk, Kazakhstan ~ 50.45°N 77.75°E	280 m (920 ft) + 605 m (1,985 ft)	air drop, weapons development		13 kt			
113 (Joe 96)	4 October 1961 07:30:54.8	MSK (3 hrs)	NZ Area C, Sukhoy Nos, Novaya Zemlya, Russia ~ 73.75°N 54.3°E	0 + 2,100 m (6,900 ft)	air drop, weapons development		3 Mt			Some sources (Khalturin) believe this was an ICBM test launched from Chita.
115 Grom (Thunder) (Joe 98)	6 October 1961	MSK (3 hrs)	Launch from Kapustin Yar, Astrakhan 48.56956°N 45.90346°E, elv: 0 + 0 m (0 + 0 ft); Detonation over Kapustin Yar, Astrakhan 48.45°N 44.3°E	N/A + 41.3 kilometres (25.7 mi)	high alt rocket (30–80 km), weapon effect		40 kt			Rocket launched from Kapustin Yar, to exlode above West Kazakhstan. Probable ABM test.
114 (Joe 97)	6 October 1961 07:00:12.2	MSK (3 hrs)	NZ Area C, Sukhoy Nos, Novaya Zemlya, Russia 74.3°N 51.6°E	0 + 2,700 m (8,900 ft)	air drop, weapons development		4 Mt			
116 (Joe 99)	8 October 1961	MSK (3 hrs)	Launch from Kola Peninsula Launch Area (Barents Sea) 70.63°N 54.02°E, elv: 0 + 20 m (0 + 66 ft); Detonation over NZ Area A, Chyornaya Guba, Novaya Zemlya, Russia 70.7°N 54.6°E	30 m (98 ft) + 1,450 m (4,760 ft)	cruise missile, weapons development	KSR-2 warhead	15 kt			KSR-2 air-to-ship cruise missile. No information on launcher, all that is a guess.
117 (Joe 100)	11 October 1961 07:39:59.9	ALMT (6 hrs)	Degelen, Semipalatinsk, Kazakhstan: V-1 49.76986°N 77.9833°E	724 m (2,375 ft) +	tunnel, fundamental science		1 kt			First Soviet underground test.
118 (Joe 101)	12 October 1961 05:31:03.6	ALMT (6 hrs)	Ground Zero, Semipalatinsk, Kazakhstan ~ 50.45°N 77.75°E	280 m (920 ft) + 670 m (2,200 ft)	air drop, weapons development		15 kt			
119 (Joe 102)	17 October 1961 07:00:00.8	ALMT (6 hrs)	Ground Zero, Semipalatinsk, Kazakhstan ~ 50.45°N 77.75°E	280 m (920 ft) + 505 m (1,657 ft)	air drop, weapons development		6.6 kt			
120 (Joe 103)	19 October 1961 05:30:42.6	ALMT (6 hrs)	Ground Zero, Semipalatinsk, Kazakhstan ~ 50.45°N 77.75°E	280 m (920 ft) + 710 m (2,330 ft)	air drop, weapons development		10 kt			
121 Raduga (Rainbow) (Joe 104?)	20 October 1961 08:07:02.0	MSK (3 hrs)	Launch from Kola Peninsula Launch Area (Barents Sea) 71°N 39°E, elv: 0–30 m (0–98 ft); Detonation over NZ Area C, Sukhoy Nos, Novaya Zemlya, Russia 73.87°N 54.35°E	N/A + 530 m (1,740 ft)	high alt rocket (30–80 km), weapons development	R-13 warhead?	1.5 Mt			An R-13 rocket fired from a submarine in the Barents Sea towards Novaya Zemlya.
122 Korall 1 (Coral) (Joe 107)	23 October 1961 08:31:22.1	MSK (3 hrs)	NZ Area A, Chyornaya Guba, Novaya Zemlya, Russia 70.703°N 54.6°E	−33 m (−108 ft) – 25 m (82 ft)	underwater, weapon effect	RDS-9	4.8 kt			Nuclear torpedo, fired by B–130 by Captain Rank 3 NA Shumkov in Chornaya Bay, ran underwater for 12.5 km distance.
123 (Joe 106)	23 October 1961 10:30:47.0	MSK (3 hrs)	NZ Area C, Sukhoy Nos, Novaya Zemlya, Russia ~ 73.75°N 54.3°E	0 + 3,500 m (11,500 ft)	air drop, weapons development		12.5 Mt			
125	25 October 1961	ALMT (6 hrs)	Ground Zero, Semipalatinsk, Kazakhstan ~ 50.4°N 77.8°E	280 m (920 ft) + 500 m (1,600 ft)	air drop, fundamental science		500 t			
124 (Joe 108)	25 October 1961 08:31:05	MSK (3 hrs)	NZ Area C, Sukhoy Nos, Novaya Zemlya, Russia ~ 73.75°N 54.3°E	0 + 1,450 m (4,760 ft)	air drop, weapons development		300 kt			
126 Korall 2 (Coral) (Joe 110)	27 October 1961 08:30:27.6	MSK (3 hrs)	NZ Area A, Chyornaya Guba, Novaya Zemlya, Russia 70.74179°N 54.60959°E	−1 m (−3.3 ft) + 1 m (3 ft 3 in)	barge, weapon effect	RDS-9	16 kt			Test of nuclear torpedo, fired by B–130 by Captain Rank 3 N.A. Shumkov in Chornaya Bay, ran underwater for 11 km (6.8 mi) distance, then broached and exploded just above the target.
129	30 October 1961	ALMT (6 hrs)	Ground Zero, Semipalatinsk, Kazakhstan ~ 50.4°N 77.8°E	280 m (920 ft) + 470 m (1,540 ft)	air drop, weapons development		90 t			
130 Tsar Bomba (Joe 111)	30 October 1961 08:33:27.8	MSK (3 hrs)	NZ Area C, Sukhoy Nos, Novaya Zemlya, Russia ~ 73.85°N 54.5°E	0 + 4,000 m (13,000 ft)	parachuted, weapons development	RDS-220	50 Mt			Largest man-made detonation ever. Cleanest weapon ever tested; 97% energy from fusion. Full yield degraded by at least half. Dropped from a heavily modified Tu-95 Bear bomber, pilot A. E. Durnovtsev. One injury on ground.
131 (Joe 112)	31 October 1961 08:29:17.2	MSK (3 hrs)	NZ Area C, Sukhoy Nos, Novaya Zemlya, Russia 73.53°N 58.92°E	0 + 2,200 m (7,200 ft)	air drop, weapons development		5 Mt			
132 (Joe 113)	31 October 1961 08:38:??	MSK (3 hrs)	NZ Area C, Sukhoy Nos, Novaya Zemlya, Russia 74.6°N 59.4°E	0 + 1,530 m (5,020 ft)	air drop, weapons development		400 kt			
133 (Joe 114)	1 November 1961	ALMT (6 hrs)	Ground Zero, Semipalatinsk, Kazakhstan ~ 50.4277°N 77.7231°E	280 m (920 ft) + 475 m (1,558 ft)	air drop, weapons development		2.7 kt			
135 (Joe 116)	2 November 1961	MSK (3 hrs)	NZ Area C, Sukhoy Nos, Novaya Zemlya, Russia 75.2°N 57.5°E	0 + 1,500 m (4,900 ft)	air drop, weapons development		280 kt			
136	2 November 1961	ALMT (6 hrs)	Ground Zero, Semipalatinsk, Kazakhstan ~ 50.4°N 77.8°E	280 m (920 ft) + 645 m (2,116 ft)	air drop, weapons development		600 t			
134 (Joe 115)	2 November 1961 08:41:??	MSK (3 hrs)	NZ Area C, Sukhoy Nos, Novaya Zemlya, Russia 74.6°N 55.4°E	0 + 1,400 m (4,600 ft)	air drop, weapons development		120 kt			
137	3 November 1961	ALMT (6 hrs)	Ground Zero, Semipalatinsk, Kazakhstan ~ 50.378°N 77.855°E	280 m (920 ft) + 0	dry surface, safety experiment		less than 0.001 kt			
138 (Joe 117)	3 November 1961	ALMT (6 hrs)	Ground Zero, Semipalatinsk, Kazakhstan ~ 50.4°N 77.8°E	280 m (920 ft) + 635 m (2,083 ft)	air drop, weapons development		900 t			
139 (Joe 118)	4 November 1961	MSK (3 hrs)	NZ Area C, Sukhoy Nos, Novaya Zemlya, Russia 73.3°N 56.6°E	0 + 1,770 m (5,810 ft)	air drop, weapons development		15 kt			
141	4 November 1961	MSK (3 hrs)	NZ Area C, Sukhoy Nos, Novaya Zemlya, Russia ~ 73°N 55°E	0 + 2,240 m (7,350 ft)	air drop, weapons development		6 kt			
142	4 November 1961	ALMT (6 hrs)	Ground Zero, Semipalatinsk, Kazakhstan ~ 50.378°N 77.855°E	280 m (920 ft) + 0	dry surface, weapons development		200 t			
140 (Joe 119)	4 November 1961 07:20:19.7	MSK (3 hrs)	NZ Area C, Sukhoy Nos, Novaya Zemlya, Russia 73.6°N 56.8°E	0 + 1,750 m (5,740 ft)	air drop, weapons development		1.5 Mt			
