= 1955 Soviet nuclear tests =

1955

Information
- Country: Soviet Union
- Test site: Ground Zero, Semipalatinsk, Kazakhstan; NZ Area A, Chyornaya Guba, Novaya Zemlya, Russia
- Period: 1955
- Number of tests: 7
- Test type: air drop, dry surface, underwater
- Max. yield: 1.6 megatonnes of TNT (6.7 PJ)

Test series chronology

The Soviet Union's 1955 nuclear test series was a group of 7 nuclear tests conducted in 1955. These tests followed the 1954 Soviet nuclear tests series and preceded the 1956 Soviet nuclear tests series.

Soviet Union's 1955 series tests and detonations
Name (Note: The US, France and Great Britain have code-named their test events, while the USSR and China did not, and therefore have only test numbers (with some exceptions – Soviet peaceful explosions were named). Word translations into English in parentheses unless the name is a proper noun. A dash followed by a number indicates a member of a salvo event. The US also sometimes named the individual explosions in such a salvo test, which results in "name1 – 1(with name2)". If test is canceled or aborted, then the row data like date and location discloses the intended plans, where known.)	Date time (UT)	Local time zone (Note: To convert the UT time into standard local, add the number of hours in parentheses to the UT time; for local daylight saving time, add one additional hour. If the result is earlier than 00:00, add 24 hours and subtract 1 from the day; if it is 24:00 or later, subtract 24 hours and add 1 to the day. Historical time zone data obtained from the IANA time zone database.)	Location (Note: Rough place name and a latitude/longitude reference; for rocket-carried tests, the launch location is specified before the detonation location, if known. Some locations are extremely accurate; others (like airdrops and space blasts) may be quite inaccurate. "~" indicates a likely pro-forma rough location, shared with other tests in that same area.)	Elevation + height (Note: Elevation is the ground level at the point directly below the explosion relative to sea level; height is the additional distance added or subtracted by tower, balloon, shaft, tunnel, air drop or other contrivance. For rocket bursts the ground level is "N/A". In some cases it is not clear if the height is absolute or relative to ground, for example, Plumbbob/John. No number or units indicates the value is unknown, while "0" means zero. Sorting on this column is by elevation and height added together.)	Delivery, (Note: Atmospheric, airdrop, balloon, gun, cruise missile, rocket, surface, tower, and barge are all disallowed by the Partial Nuclear Test Ban Treaty. Sealed shaft and tunnel are underground, and remained useful under the PTBT. Intentional cratering tests are borderline; they occurred under the treaty, were sometimes protested, and generally overlooked if the test was declared to be a peaceful use.) Purpose (Note: Include weapons development, weapon effects, safety test, transport safety test, war, science, joint verification and industrial/peaceful, which may be further broken down.)	Device (Note: Designations for test items where known, "?" indicates some uncertainty about the preceding value, nicknames for particular devices in quotes. This category of information is often not officially disclosed.)	Yield (Note: Estimated energy yield in tons, kilotons, and megatons. A ton of TNT equivalent is defined as 4.184 gigajoules (1 gigacalorie).)	Fallout (Note: Radioactive emission to the atmosphere aside from prompt neutrons, where known. The measured species is only iodine-131 if mentioned, otherwise it is all species. No entry means unknown, probably none if underground and "all" if not; otherwise notation for whether measured on the site only or off the site, where known, and the measured amount of radioactivity released.)	References	Notes
19 (Joe 15)	29 July 1955 02:00:??	ALMT (6 hrs)	Ground Zero, Semipalatinsk, Kazakhstan ~ 50.4°N 77.8°E	280 m (920 ft) + 2 m (6 ft 7 in)	dry surface, weapons development	RDS-9	1.3 kt			Tests of the T-5 torpedo warhead RDS-9.
20 (Joe 16)	2 August 1955 03:00:??	ALMT (6 hrs)	Ground Zero, Semipalatinsk, Kazakhstan 50.372°N 77.825°E	280 m (920 ft) + 2 m (6 ft 7 in)	dry surface, weapons development	RDS-9	12 kt			Tests of the T-5 torpedo warhead RDS-9.
21	5 August 1955	ALMT (6 hrs)	Ground Zero, Semipalatinsk, Kazakhstan 50.372°N 77.825°E	280 m (920 ft) + 1 m (3 ft 3 in)	dry surface, weapons development	RDS-9	1.2 kt			Tests of the T-5 torpedo warhead RDS-9.
unnumbered #1	21 September 1955	ALMT (6 hrs)	Ground Zero, Semipalatinsk, Kazakhstan 50.372°N 77.825°E	280 m (920 ft) +	dry surface,		no yield			
22 (Joe 17)	21 September 1955 05:00:54	MSK (3 hrs)	NZ Area A, Chyornaya Guba, Novaya Zemlya, Russia 70.703°N 54.6°E	0–12 m (39 ft)	underwater, weapon effect	RDS-9/T-5 torpedo	3.5 kt			First test at NTSNZ of a torpedo design. 30 ships arrayed around the blast, some quite new. Sunk and damaged several.
23 (Joe 18)	6 November 1955 04:50:??	ALMT (6 hrs)	Ground Zero, Semipalatinsk, Kazakhstan ~ 50.412434°N 77.774549°E	280 m (920 ft) + 1,000 m (3,300 ft)	air drop, weapons development	RDS-27	250 kt			aka RDS-27, boosted fission.
24 Binarnaya (Binary)? (Joe 19)	22 November 1955	ALMT (6 hrs)	Ground Zero, Semipalatinsk, Kazakhstan 50.42°N 77.78°E	280 m (920 ft) + 1,550 m (5,090 ft)	air drop, weapons development	RDS-37	1.6 Mt			aka RDS-37, Soviet superbomb. 2 stage radiation implosion (Sakharov's "third idea", the equivalent to the Teller-Ullam design). Two people were killed in collapses because an inversion layer focused the energy, 47 other injuries.
