= 1957 Soviet nuclear tests =

1957

Information
- Country: Soviet Union
- Test site: Ground Zero, Semipalatinsk, Kazakhstan; NZ Area A, Chyornaya Guba, Novaya Zemlya, Russia; NZ Area C, Sukhoy Nos, Novaya Zemlya, Russia; Western Kazakhstan
- Period: 1957
- Number of tests: 16
- Test type: air drop, high alt rocket (30–80 km), tower, underwater
- Max. yield: 2.9 megatonnes of TNT (12 PJ)

Test series chronology

The Soviet Union's 1957 nuclear test series was a group of 16 nuclear tests conducted in 1957. These tests followed the 1956 Soviet nuclear tests series and preceded the 1958 Soviet nuclear tests series.

Soviet Union's 1957 series tests and detonations
Name (Note: The US, France and Great Britain have code-named their test events, while the USSR and China did not, and therefore have only test numbers (with some exceptions – Soviet peaceful explosions were named). Word translations into English in parentheses unless the name is a proper noun. A dash followed by a number indicates a member of a salvo event. The US also sometimes named the individual explosions in such a salvo test, which results in "name1 – 1(with name2)". If test is canceled or aborted, then the row data like date and location discloses the intended plans, where known.)	Date time (UT)	Local time zone (Note: To convert the UT time into standard local, add the number of hours in parentheses to the UT time; for local daylight saving time, add one additional hour. If the result is earlier than 00:00, add 24 hours and subtract 1 from the day; if it is 24:00 or later, subtract 24 hours and add 1 to the day. Historical time zone data obtained from the IANA time zone database.)	Location (Note: Rough place name and a latitude/longitude reference; for rocket-carried tests, the launch location is specified before the detonation location, if known. Some locations are extremely accurate; others (like airdrops and space blasts) may be quite inaccurate. "~" indicates a likely pro-forma rough location, shared with other tests in that same area.)	Elevation + height (Note: Elevation is the ground level at the point directly below the explosion relative to sea level; height is the additional distance added or subtracted by tower, balloon, shaft, tunnel, air drop or other contrivance. For rocket bursts the ground level is "N/A". In some cases it is not clear if the height is absolute or relative to ground, for example, Plumbbob/John. No number or units indicates the value is unknown, while "0" means zero. Sorting on this column is by elevation and height added together.)	Delivery, (Note: Atmospheric, airdrop, balloon, gun, cruise missile, rocket, surface, tower, and barge are all disallowed by the Partial Nuclear Test Ban Treaty. Sealed shaft and tunnel are underground, and remained useful under the PTBT. Intentional cratering tests are borderline; they occurred under the treaty, were sometimes protested, and generally overlooked if the test was declared to be a peaceful use.) Purpose (Note: Include weapons development, weapon effects, safety test, transport safety test, war, science, joint verification and industrial/peaceful, which may be further broken down.)	Device (Note: Designations for test items where known, "?" indicates some uncertainty about the preceding value, nicknames for particular devices in quotes. This category of information is often not officially disclosed.)	Yield (Note: Estimated energy yield in tons, kilotons, and megatons. A ton of TNT equivalent is defined as 4.184 gigajoules (1 gigacalorie).)	Fallout (Note: Radioactive emission to the atmosphere aside from prompt neutrons, where known. The measured species is only iodine-131 if mentioned, otherwise it is all species. No entry means unknown, probably none if underground and "all" if not; otherwise notation for whether measured on the site only or off the site, where known, and the measured amount of radioactivity released.)	References	Notes
34 ZUR-215 (Joe 29)	19 January 1957	URAT (5 hrs)	Launch from Kapustin Yar, Astrakhan, elv: 0 + 0 m (0 + 0 ft); Detonation over Western Kazakhstan ~	N/A + 270 m (890 ft)	high alt rocket (30–80 km), weapon effect		10 kt			First successful air nuclear explosion with missile launch for Kapustin Yar. The missile was the ZUR-215, later known as the R-5M. The test has become known by the name of the rocket.
35 (Joe 30)	8 March 1957	ALMT (6 hrs)	Ground Zero, Semipalatinsk, Kazakhstan ~	280 m (920 ft) + 610 m (2,000 ft)	air drop, weapons development		19 kt			
36 (Joe 31)	3 April 1957	ALMT (6 hrs)	Ground Zero, Semipalatinsk, Kazakhstan ~	280 m (920 ft) + 1,100 m (3,600 ft)	air drop, weapons development		42 kt			
37 (Joe 32)	6 April 1957	ALMT (6 hrs)	Ground Zero, Semipalatinsk, Kazakhstan ~	280 m (920 ft) + 1,145 m (3,757 ft)	air drop, weapons development		57 kt			
38 (Joe 33)	10 April 1957	ALMT (6 hrs)	Ground Zero, Semipalatinsk, Kazakhstan	280 m (920 ft) + 2,000 m (6,600 ft)	air drop, weapons development	TN	680 kt			
39 (Joe 34)	12 April 1957	ALMT (6 hrs)	Ground Zero, Semipalatinsk, Kazakhstan ~	280 m (920 ft) + 1,145 m (3,757 ft)	air drop, weapons development		22 kt			
40 (Joe 35)	16 April 1957	ALMT (6 hrs)	Ground Zero, Semipalatinsk, Kazakhstan ~	280 m (920 ft) + 2,000 m (6,600 ft)	air drop, weapons development	TN	320 kt			
41 (Joe 36)	22 August 1957 06:30:??	ALMT (6 hrs)	Ground Zero, Semipalatinsk, Kazakhstan	280 m (920 ft) + 1,880 m (6,170 ft)	air drop, weapons development	TN	520 kt			
42	26 August 1957	ALMT (6 hrs)	Ground Zero, Semipalatinsk, Kazakhstan ~	280 m (920 ft) + 410 m (1,350 ft)	air drop, safety experiment		100 t			First test for nuclear weapons safety, but why dropped?.
43 (Joe 37)	7 September 1957 08:00:01.0	MSK (3 hrs)	NZ Area A, Chyornaya Guba, Novaya Zemlya, Russia	2 m (6 ft 7 in) + 15 m (49 ft)	tower, fundamental science		32 kt			The only surface test at NTSNZ, 320 ft (98 m) in from Guba Chernya bay. Study of anchored ship effects. GZ was quite contaminated, 40,000 R/hr.
44 (Joe 38)	13 September 1957	ALMT (6 hrs)	Ground Zero, Semipalatinsk, Kazakhstan ~	280 m (920 ft) + 780 m (2,560 ft)	air drop, weapons development		5.9 kt			
45 (Joe 39)	24 September 1957 09:00:??	MSK (3 hrs)	NZ Area C, Sukhoy Nos, Novaya Zemlya, Russia	0 + 2,000 m (6,600 ft)	air drop, weapons development	TN	1.6 Mt			First air test at NTSNZ; aerial bomb drop.
46 (Joe 40)	26 September 1957 05:00:??	ALMT (6 hrs)	Ground Zero, Semipalatinsk, Kazakhstan ~	280 m (920 ft) + 2,000 m (6,600 ft)	air drop, weapons development		13 kt			
47 (Joe 41)	6 October 1957 09:00:??	MSK (3 hrs)	NZ Area C, Sukhoy Nos, Novaya Zemlya, Russia	0 + 2,120 m (6,960 ft)	air drop, weapons development	RDS-46A/R-7 TN	2.9 Mt			
48 (Joe 42)	10 October 1957 06:54:32	MSK (3 hrs)	NZ Area A, Chyornaya Guba, Novaya Zemlya, Russia	0–20 m (66 ft)	underwater, weapon effect	RDS-9/T-5 torpedo.	6 kt			Launched underwater by B-130 submarine "some distance" from Guba Chernaya. Very low residual radiation.
49 (Joe 43)	28 December 1957	ALMT (6 hrs)	Ground Zero, Semipalatinsk, Kazakhstan ~	280 m (920 ft) + 615 m (2,018 ft)	air drop, weapons development		12 kt			
