= Mark 90 nuclear bomb =

American nuclear depth charge

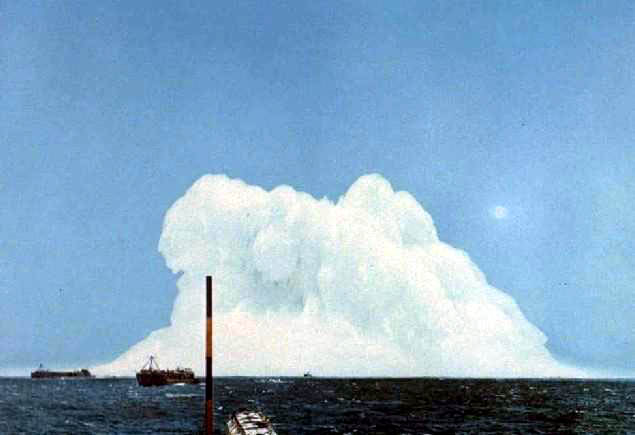
Operation Wigwam test of a Mark 90 "Betty"

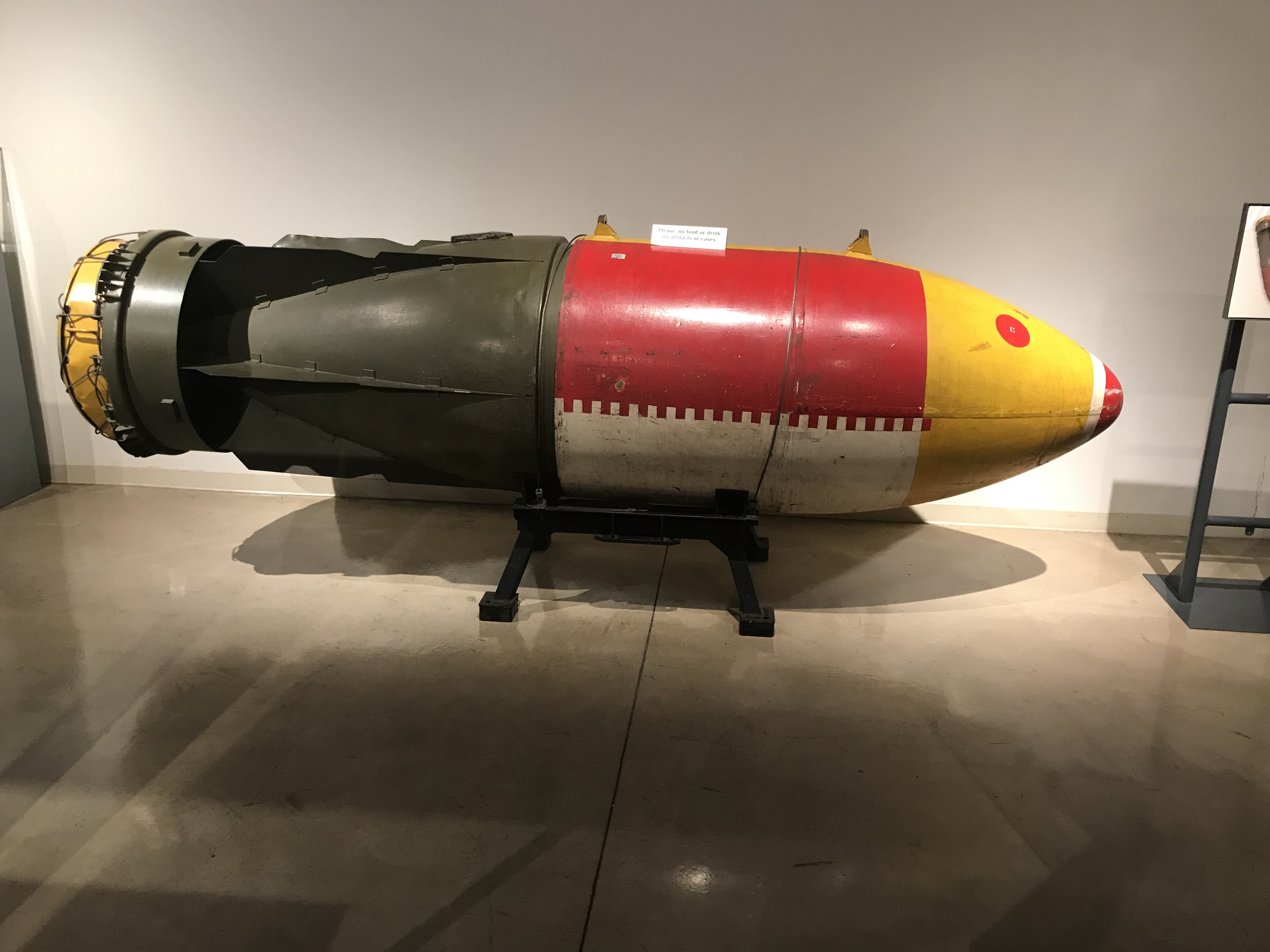
Mark 90 casing in U.S. Navy Museum

The Mark 90 nuclear bomb, given the nickname "Betty", was a Cold War nuclear depth charge, developed by the United States in 1952.

It had a length of 10 ft 2 in (3.10 m), a diameter of 2 ft 7.5 in (0.80 m), and a weight of 1,243 lb (564 kg), and it carried a Mark 7 nuclear warhead with a yield of 32 kilotons. Its purpose was to serve as an anti-submarine weapon for the United States Navy.

A test of the Mark 90 was conducted in 1955, as Operation Wigwam.

A total of about 225 such bombs were produced.

All units were withdrawn from service by 1960.

== Accident ==
On September 25, 1959, a United States Navy Martin P5M-2 Marlin (BuNo 135540, SG tailcode, '6', of VP-50) was patrolling out of NAS Whidbey Island when it was forced to ditch in the Pacific Ocean, about 100 miles (160 km) west of the Washington-Oregon border.

A Mark 90 depth charge casing was lost and never recovered, but it was not fitted with an active warhead. The ten crew members were rescued by the US Coast Guard, after ten hours in a raft. The press was not notified at the time.

== See also ==
- List of accidents and incidents involving military aircraft (1955–1959)
