= Haplogroup L-M20 =

Human Y chromosome DNA grouping common in South Asia and the Mediterranean

- Possible time of origin: 30,000 - 43,000 years BP
- Possible place of origin: Southern Iran, South Asia or Pamir Mountains
- Ancestor: LT
- Defining mutations: M11, M20, M61, M185, L656, L863, L878, L879
- Highest frequencies: Southern Pakistan, Northern Afghanistan, South India

Haplogroup L-M20 is a human Y-DNA haplogroup, which is defined by SNPs M11, M20, M61 and M185. As a secondary descendant of haplogroup K and a primary branch of haplogroup LT, haplogroup L currently has the alternative phylogenetic name of K1a, and is a sibling of haplogroup T (a.k.a. K1b).

The presence of L-M20 has been observed at varying levels throughout South Asia, peaking in populations native to the southern Pakistani province of Balochistan (28%), Northern Afghanistan (25%), and Southern India (19%). The clade also occurs in Tajikistan and Anatolia, as well as at lower frequencies in Iran. It has also been present for millennia at very low levels in the Caucasus, Europe and Central Asia. The subclade L2 (L-L595) has been found in Europe and Western Asia, but is extremely rare.

== Phylogenetic tree ==
There are several confirmed and proposed phylogenetic trees available for haplogroup L-M20. The scientifically accepted one is the Y-Chromosome Consortium (YCC) one published in Karafet 2008 and subsequently updated. A draft tree that shows emerging science is provided by Thomas Krahn at the Genomic Research Center in Houston, Texas. The International Society of Genetic Genealogy (ISOGG) also provides an amateur tree.

This is Thomas Krahn at the Genomic Research Center's Draft tree Proposed Tree for haplogroup L-M20:

- L-M20 M11, M20, M61, M185, L656, L863, L878, L879
  - L-M22 (L1) M22, M295, PAGES00121
    - L-M317 (L1b) M317, L655
      - L-L656 (L1b1) L656
        - L-M349 (L1b1a) M349
      - L-M274 M274
      - L-L1310 L1310
      - L-SK1412
    - L-L1304 L1304
      - L-M27 (L1a1) M27, M76, P329.1, L1318, L1319, L1320, L1321
      - L-M357 (L1a2) M357, L1307
        - L-PK3 PK3
        - L-L1305 L1305, L1306, L1307
  - L-L595 (L2) L595
    - L-L864 L864, L865, L866, L867, L868, L869, L870, L877

== Origins ==
L-M20 is a descendant of Haplogroup LT, which is a descendant of haplogroup K-M9. According to Dr. Spencer Wells, L-M20 originated in the Eurasian K-M9 clan that migrated eastwards from the Middle East, and later southwards from the Pamir Knot into present-day Pakistan and India. These people arrived in the Indian subcontinent approximately 30,000 years ago. Hence, it is hypothesized that the first bearer of M20 marker was born either in the subcontinent or the Middle East. Other studies have proposed either a Southern Iran or South Asian origin for L-M20 and associated its expansion in the Indus valley to Neolithic farmers. It is also suggested that L-M20 may be one of the haplogroups of the original creators of the Indus Valley Civilisation. Time estimates generated based on seven Y-STR loci within L-M20 lineages for north (14.6±7.3 kya) and south (17.8±8.4 kya) Afghanistan populations are intermediate to those of Pakistan (26.3±5.3 kya) and India (7.5±1.7 kya). Furthermore, Pakistan displays higher haplotype variance (0.548) than India (0.118), suggesting that L-M20 most likely originated in what is today Pakistan then subsequently spread into southern India.

McElreavy and Quintana-Murci, writing on the Indus Valley Civilisation, state that

One Y-chromosome haplogroup (L-M20) has a high mean frequency of 14% in Pakistan and so differs from all other haplogroups in its frequency distribution. L-M20 is also observed, although at lower frequencies, in neighbouring countries, such as India, Tajikistan, Uzbekistan and Russia. Both the frequency distribution and estimated expansion time (~7,000 YBP) of this lineage suggest that its spread in the Indus Valley may be associated with the expansion of local farming groups during the Neolithic period.

Sengupta et al. (2006) observed three subbranches of haplogroup L: L1-M76 (L1a1), L2-M317 (L1b) and L3-M357 (L1a2), with distinctive geographic affiliations. Almost all Indian members of haplogroup L are L1 derived, with L3-M357 occurring only sporadically (0.4%). Conversely in Pakistan, L3-M357 subclade account for 86% of L-M20 chromosomes and reaches an intermediate frequency of 6.8%, overall. L1-M76 occurs at a frequency of 7.5% in India and 5.1% in Pakistan, exhibiting peak variance distribution in the Maharashtra region in coastal western India.

=== Proposed Elamo-Dravidian connection ===
The contentious Elamo-Dravidian hypothesis posits that the proto–Elamo-Dravidian language originated and spread from ancient Elam (present-day southwestern Iran) into the Indian subcontinent with agriculture, and that the Harappan language of the Indus Valley Civilisation was a related one. Some genetic studies propose a link between the migratory pattern of lineages derived from subclade L1-M22 and the spread of Elamo-Dravidian languages. According to Palanichamy et al. (2015), the presence of several haplogroup L subclades among Iranian populations and mostly L1a among Dravidian peoples of South India, while being rare among Indo-Aryan speakers, along with the coalescence time (~9.1 kya), indicate that L1a arrived from Iran through Neolithic farmers, and was probably responsible for the spread of the Dravidian language to India.

According to Pathak et at. (2024), subclade L1-M22 originated in West Asia about 20,600 ybp. Based on the findings from recent genetic researches, this study emphasizes that the Iranian element within the Indus valley population came from Caucasus/Iranian hunter-gatherers (CIHG), who were related to, yet different from Iranian farmers. The study supports the Elamo-Dravidian hypothesis by connecting all L1a lineages to the original CIHG population, whose descendants settled in both Elam and the Indus valley. The study puts forward the view that L1a descendants that remained in West Asia possibly participated in the development of the Elamite language, while the ones that moved from the Iranian plateau to the Indus valley, after 8000 ybp, introduced Dravidian languages to South Asia. In the Indus valley, people of CIHG ancestry mixed with those of Ancient Ancestral South Indian (AASI) ancestry, to form the Indus Periphery Cline (IPC) lineage that typically represented the IVC population. It is suggested that after the collapse of the Indus Valley Civilization, the IPC groups moved eastwards and southwards, and mixed with the pre-existing AASI heavy populations, giving rise to the Ancestral South Indians (ASI), an ancestry which correlates strongly with the spread of Dravidian languages.

== Geographical distribution ==
In India, L-M20 has a higher frequency among Dravidian castes, but is somewhat rarer in Indo-Aryan castes. In Pakistan, it has a frequency of about 28% in the southern regions including southern Baluchistan, from where the agricultural creators of the Indus valley civilization emerged .

Preliminary evidence gleaned from non-scientific sources, such as individuals who have had their Y-chromosomes tested by commercial labs, suggests that most European examples of Haplogroup L-M20 might belong to the subclade L2-M317, which is, among South Asian populations, generally the rarest of the subclades of Haplogroup L.

=== South Asia ===
==== India ====
It has higher frequency among Dravidian castes (ca. 17-19%) but is somewhat rarer in Indo-Aryan castes (ca. 5-6%). The presence of haplogroup L-M20 is quite rare among tribal groups (ca. 5,6-7%).( However, the Korova tribe of Uttara Kannada in which L-M11 occurs at 68% is an exception.

A 2018 study primarily focussed on Northwest India, a region formerly covered by Indus Valley Civilisation, found significant presence of L-M20 among the populations studied; viz. Gujjar of Rajasthan (63%), Ror of Haryana (29%) and Kamboj of Rajasthan (17%). L2a2 is around 62.7% among Brokpa of Ladakh. With a frequency of 54.9%, L-M20 constitutes a major lineage among Indian Parsi priests. It reaches an overall frequency of 21% among Indian Parsis, in general. L-M20 was found at 38% in the Bharwad caste and 21% in Charan caste from Junagarh district in Gujarat. It has also been reported at 17% in the Kare Vokkal tribe from Uttara Kannada in Karnataka. It is also found at low frequencies in other populations from Junagarh district and Uttara Kannada. L-M20 is the single largest male lineage (36.8%) among the Jat people of Northern India and is found at 16.33% among the Gujar's of Jammu and Kashmir. It also occurs at 18.6% among the Konkanastha Brahmins of the Konkan region and at 15% among the Maratha's of Maharashtra. L-M20 is also found at 32.35% in the Vokkaligas and at 17.82% in the Lingayats of Karnataka.

And available data shows that among Tamils, L-M20 is found at 48% among Kallar, 28.57% among Vanniyars, 26% among the Saurashtra people, 25.47% among the Nadars, 20.7% among the Ambalakarar, 20.56% among Tamil Yadavas, 17.2% among the Iyer and 16.7% among the Iyengar castes of Tamil Nadu. L-M11 is found in frequencies of 8-16% among Indian Jews. L-M20 has an overall frequency of 12% in Punjab. 2% of Siddis have also been reported with L-M11. Haplogroup L-M20 is currently present in the Indian population at an overall frequency of ca. 7-15%. (Note: see Basu 2003, Cordaux 2004, Sengupta 2006, and Thamseem 2006.)

==== Pakistan ====
The greatest concentration of Haplogroup L-M20 is along the Indus River in Pakistan where the Indus Valley civilization flourished during 3300–1300 BC with its mature period between 2600 and 1900 BCE. L-M357's highest frequency and diversity is found in the Balochistan province at 28% with a moderate distribution among the general Pakistani population at 11.6%. It is also found in Afghanistan ethnic counterparts as well, such as with the Pashtuns and Balochis. L-M357 is found frequently among Burusho (approx. 12%) and Pashtuns (approx. 7%),

L1a and L1c-M357 are found at 24% among Balochis, L1a and L1c are found at 8% among the Dravidian-speaking Brahui, L1c is found at 25% among Kalash, L1c is found at 15% among Burusho, L1a-M76 and L1b-M317 are found at 2% among the Makranis and L1c is found at 3.6% of Sindhis according to Julie di Cristofaro et al. 2013. L-M20 is found at 17.78% among the Parsis. L3a is found at 23% among the Nuristanis in both Pakistan and Afghanistan.

L-PK3 is found in approximately 23% of Kalash in northwest Pakistan.

In one study, the haplogroup L was found also observed among the Gurjars of Swabi district of Khyber Pakhtunkhwa at a frequency of (20.97%) in northwest Pakistan.

=== Middle East and Anatolia ===
L-M20 was found in 51% of Syrians from Raqqa, a northern Syrian city whose previous inhabitants were wiped out by Mongol genocides and repopulated in recent times by local Bedouin populations and Chechen war refugees from Russia (El-Sibai 2009). In a small sample of Israeli Druze haplogroup L-M20 was found in 7 out of 20 (35%). However, studies done on bigger samples showed that L-M20 averages 5% in Israeli Druze, (Note: 12/222 Shlush et al. 2008) 8% in Lebanese Druze, (Note: 1/25 Shlush et al. 2008) and it was not found in a sample of 59 Syrian Druze. Haplogroup L-M20 has been found in 2.0% (1/50) (Wells 2001) to 5.25% (48/914) of Lebanese (Zalloua 2008).

Populations	Distribution	Source
Turkey	57% in Afshar village, 12% (10/83) in Black Sea Region, 6.6% (7/106) of Turks in Turkey, 4.2% (1/523 L-M349 and 21/523 L-M11(xM27, M349))	Cinnioğlu 2004, Gokcumen 2008
Iran	54.9% (42/71) L in Priest Zoroastrian Parsis; 22.2% L1b and L1c in South Iran (2/9); 8% to 16% L2-L595, L1a, L1b and L1c of Kurds in Kordestan (2-4/25); 9.1% L-M20 (7/77) of Persians in Eastern Iran; 3.4% L-M76 (4/117) and 2.6% L-M317 (3/117) for a total of 6.0% (7/117) haplogroup L-M20 in Southern Iran; 3.0% (1/33) L-M357 in Northern Iran; 4.2% L1c-M357 of Azeris in East Azeris (1/21); 4.8% L1a and L1b of Persians in Esfahan (2/42)	Regueiro 2006, Di Cristofaro et al. 2013, Malyarchuk 2013
Syria	51.0% (33/65) of Syrians in Raqqa, 31.0% of Eastern Syrians	El-Sibai 2009
Laz	41.7% (15/36) L1b-M317	
Saudi Arabians	15.6% ( 4/32 of L-M76 and 1/32 of L-317 ) 1.91% (2/157=1.27% L-M76 and 1/157=0.64% L-M357)	Abu-Amero 2009
Kurds	3.2% of Kurds in Southeast Turkey	Flores 2005
Iraq	3.1% (2/64) L-M22	Sanchez 2005
Armenians	1.63% (12/734) to 4.3% (2/47)	Weale 2001 and Wells 2001
Omanis	1% L-M11	Luis 2004
Qataris	2.8% (2/72 L-M76)	Cadenas 2008
UAE Arabs	3.0% (4/164 L-M76 and 1/164 L-M357)	Cadenas 2008

=== Central Asia ===
==== Afghanistan ====
A study on the Pashtun male lineages in Afghanistan, found that Haplogroup L-M20, with an overall frequency of 9.5%, is the second most abundant male lineage among them. It exhibits substantial disparity in its distribution on either side of the Hindu Kush range, with 25% of the northern Afghan Pashtuns belonging to this lineage, compared with only 4.8% of males from the south. Specifically, paragroup L3*-M357 accounts for the majority of the L-M20 chromosomes among Afghan Pashtuns in both the north (20.5%) and south (4.1%). An earlier study involving a lesser number of samples had reported that L1c comprises 12.24% of the Afghan Pashtun male lineages. L1c is also found at 7.69% among the Balochs of Afghanistan. However, L1a-M76 occurs in a much more higher frequency among the Balochs (20 to 61.54%), and is found at lower levels in Kyrgyz, Tajik, Uzbek and Turkmen populations.

Populations	Distribution	Source
Tajiks	22.5% (9/40), 11.1% (6/54) L1a and L1c in Balkh Province, 9.0% (7/78), 6.3% (1/16) L1c in Samangan Province, 5.4% (2/37) L1c in Badakhshan Province	Malyarchuk 2013Wells 2001
Uzbeks	20% (1/5) L1c in Balkh Province, 14.3% (4/28) L1a and L1c in Sar-e Pol Province, 7.5% (7/94)L1a, L1b and L1c in Jawzjan Province, 3.0% (11/366) to 3.7% (2/54)	Wells 2001, Karafet et al. 2001 and Di Cristofaro et al. 2013
Uyghurs	16.7% (1/6) L1c-M357 in Kyrgyzstan	Di Cristofaro et al. 2013
Pamiris	16% (7/44) of Shugnanis, 12% 3/25 of Ishkashimis, 0/30 Bartangis	Wells 2001
Hazaras	12.5% (1/8) L1a in Balkh Province, 1.9% (2/69) L1a in Bamiyan Province	Di Cristofaro et al. 2013
Yagnobis	9.7% (3/31)	Wells 2001
Bukharan Arabs	9.5% (4/42)	Wells 2001
Pashtuns	9.4% (5/53) L1a and L1b in Kunduz Province, 2.9% (1/34) L1c in Baghlan Province	Di Cristofaro et al. 2013
Dungans	8.3% (1/12) L1c in Kyrgyzstan	Di Cristofaro et al. 2013
Uyghurs (Lopliks)	7.8% (5/64) L-M357 in Qarchugha Village, Lopnur County, Xinjiang	Liu 2018
Karakalpaks	4.5% (2/44)	Wells 2001
Uyghurs	4.4% (3/68)	Karafet et al. 2001 and Hammer 2005 (Note: In Hammer 2005, see the Supplementary Material.)
Turkmens	4.1% (3/74) L1a in Jawzjan Province	Di Cristofaro et al. 2013
Chelkans	4.0% (1/25)	Dulik 2012 and Dulik 2012
Kyrgyz	2.7% (1/37) L1c in Northwest Kyrgyzstan and 2.5% (1/40) L1a in Central Kyrgyzstan	Di Cristofaro et al. 2013
Kazan Tatars	2.6% (1/38)	Wells 2001
Hui	1.9% (1/54)	Karafet et al. 2001
Bashkirs	0.64% (3/471)	Lobov 2009

=== East Asia ===
Researchers studying samples of Y-DNA from populations of East Asia have rarely tested their samples for any of the mutations that define Haplogroup L. However, mutations for Haplogroup L have been tested and detected in samples of Balinese (13/641 = 2.0% L-M20), Han Chinese (1/57 = 1.8%), Dolgans from Sakha and Taymyr (1/67 = 1.5% L-M20) and Koreans (3/506 = 0.6% L-M20).

=== Europe ===
An article by O. Semino et al. published in the journal Science (Volume 290, 10 November 2000) reported the detection of the M11-G mutation, which is one of the mutations that defines Haplogroup L, in approximately 1% to 3% of samples from Georgia, Greece, Hungary, Calabria (Italy), and Andalusia (Spain). The sizes of the samples analyzed in this study were generally quite small, so it is possible that the actual frequency of Haplogroup L-M20 among Mediterranean European populations may be slightly lower or higher than that reported by Semino et al., but there seems to be no study to date that has described more precisely the distribution of Haplogroup L-M20 in Southwest Asia and Europe.

Populations	Distribution	Source
Fascia, Italy	19.2% of Fascians L-M20	
Nonstal, Italy	10% of Nonesi L-M20	Di Giacomo 2003
Samnium, Italy	10% of Aquilanis L-M20	Boattini 2013
Vicenza, Italy	10% of Venetians L-M20	Boattini 2013
South Tyrol, Italy	8.9% of Ladin speakers from Val Badia, 8.3% of Val Badia, 2.9% of Puster Valley, 2.2% of German speakers from Val Badia, 2% of German speakers from Upper Vinschgau, 1.9% of German speakers from Lower Vinschgau and 1.7% of Italian speakers from Bolzano	Pichler 2006 and Thomas 2007.
Georgians	20% (2/10) of Georgians in Gali, 14.3% (2/14) of Georgians in Chokhatauri, 12.5% (2/16) of Georgians in Martvili, 11.8% (2/17) of Georgians in Abasha, 11.1% (2/18) of Georgians in Baghdati, 10% (1/10) of Georgians in Gardabani, 9.1% (1/11) of Georgians in Adigeni, 6.9% (2/29) of Georgians in Omalo, 5.9% (1/17) of Georgians in Gurjaani, 5.9% (1/17) of Georgians in Lentekhi and 1.5% (1/66) L-M357(xPK3) to 1.6% (1/63) L-M11	Battaglia 2008, Semino 2000 and Tarkhnishvili 2014
Daghestan, Russia	10% of Chechens in Daghestan, 9.5% (4/42) of Avars, 8.3% (2/24) of Tats, 3.7% (1/27) of Chamalins	Yunusbaev 2006, Caciagli 2009
Arkhangelsk Oblast, Russia	5.9% of Russians L1c-M357	
Estonia	L2-L595 and L1-M22 are found in 5.3%, 3.5%, 1.4% and 0.8% of Estonians	Scozzari 2001 and Lappalainen 2008
Balkarians, Russia	5.3% (2/38) L-M317	Battaglia 2008
Portugal	5.0% of Coimbra	Beleza 2006
Bulgaria	3.9% of Bulgarians	
Flanders	L1a*: 3.17% of Mechelen 2.4% of Turnhout and 1.3% of Kempen. L1b*: 0.74% of West Flanders and East Flanders	Larmuseau 2010 and Larmuseau 2011
Antsiferovo, Novgorod	2.3% of Russians	
East Tyrol, Austria	L-M20 is found in 1.9% of Tyroleans in Region B (Isel, Lower Drau, Defereggen, Virgen, and Kals valley)	
Gipuzkoa, Basque Country	L1b is found in 1.7% of Gipuzkoans	Young 2011
North Tyrol, Austria	L-M20 is found in 0.8% of Tyroleans in Reutte	

=== Southern Africa and the Swahili Coast ===
Researchers in 2013 studying the origins of the Lemba people - who are of paternal South Arabian ancestry - found that 13.8% of Lemba males carried the Y-DNA L-M20, specifically the subclade L-M349 making it the 4th most common lineage amongst them. A Lemba sample from South Africa submitted to Familytreedna in 2023 was found to carry a yet unnamed L-M349 subclade of L-FT408126 which was closest to 2 samples from Iraq and Iran.

Researchers also found traces of traces of L-M20 on the Swahili coast in Kenya amounting to 4.2% of the total population.

== Subclade distribution ==
=== L1 (M295) ===
L-M295 is found from Western Europe to South Asia. (Note: FTDNA lab results, May 2011)

The L1 subclade is also found at low frequencies on the Comoros Islands.

=== L1a1 (M27) ===
L-M27 is found in 14.5% of Indians and 15% of Sri Lankans, with a moderate distribution in other populations of Pakistan, southern Iran and Europe, but slightly higher Middle East Arab populations. There is a very minor presence among Siddi's (2%), as well.

=== L1a2 (M357) ===
L-M357 is found frequently among Burushos, Kalashas, Brokpa, Jats, Pashtuns, with a moderate distribution among other populations in Pakistan, Georgia, Chechens, Ingushes, northern Iran, India, the UAE, and Saudi Arabia. Brokpa of Ladakh carry Y haplogroup L2a2 around 62.7% according to generetic study of 2019.

A Chinese study published in 2018 found L-M357/L1307 in 7.8% (5/64) of a sample of Loplik Uyghurs from Qarchugha Village, Lopnur County, Xinjiang.

L-PK3

L-PK3, which is downstream of L-M357, is found frequently among Kalash.

=== L1b (M317) ===
L-M317 is found at low frequency in Central Asia, Southwest Asia, and Europe.

In Europe, L-M317 has been found in Northeast Italians (3/67 = 4.5%) and Greeks (1/92 = 1.1%).

In Caucasia, L-M317 has been found in Mountain Jews (2/10 = 20%), Avars (4/42 = 9.5%, 3%), Balkarians (2/38 = 5.3%), Abkhaz (8/162 = 4.9%, 2/58 = 3.4%), Chamalals (1/27 = 3.7%), Abazins (2/88 = 2.3%), Adyghes (3/154 = 1.9%), Chechens (3/165 = 1.8%), Armenians (1/57 = 1.8%), Lezgins (1/81 = 1.2%), and Ossetes (1/132 = 0.76% North Ossetians, 2/230 = 0.9% Iron).

L-M317 has been found in Makranis (2/20 = 10%) in Pakistan, Iranians (3/186 = 1.6%), Pashtuns in Afghanistan (1/87 = 1.1%), and Uzbeks in Afghanistan (1/127 = 0.79%).

=== L1b1 (M349) ===
L-M349 is found in some Crimean Karaites who are Levites. Some of L-M349's branches are found in West Asia, including L-Y31183 in Lebanon, L-Y31184 in Armenia, and L-Y130640 in Iraq, Iran, Yemen and South Africa. Others are found in Europe, such as L-PAGE116 in Italy, L-FT304386 in Slovenia, and L-FGC36841 in Moldova. 13.8% of Lemba males carry L-M349 under the clade L-Y130640. This percentage is most likely due to a founder effect in their population making them the only group on the African continent with any substantial proportion of L-M20.

=== L2 (L595) ===
L2-L595 is extremely rare, and has been identified by private testing in individuals from Europe and Western Asia.

Two confirmed L2-L595 individuals from Iran were reported in a 2020 study supplementary. Possible but unconfirmed cases of L2 include 4% (1/25) L-M11(xM76, M27, M317, M357) in a sample of Iranians in Kordestan and 2% (2/100) L-M20(xM27, M317, M357) in a sample of Shapsugs, among other rare reported cases of L which don't fall into the common branches.

L2 in modern populations
Region	Population	n/Sample size	Percentage	Source
West Asia	Azerbaijan	2/204	1	
Central Europe	Germany	1/8641	0.0000115	
Southern Europe	Greece	1/753	0.1	
West Asia	Iran	2/800	0.25	
Southern Europe	Italy	3/913	0.3	

== Ancient DNA ==
- Three individuals from Maykop culture c. 3200 BCE were found to belong to haplogroup L2-L595.
- Three individuals who lived in the Chalcolithic era (c. 5700–6250 years BP), found in the Areni-1 ("Bird's Eye") cave in the South Caucasus mountains (present-day Vayots Dzor Province, Armenia), were also identified as belonging to haplogroup L1a. One individual's genome indicated that he had red hair and blue eyes. Their genetic data is listed in the table below.
- Narasimhan et al. (2018) analyzed skeletons from the BMAC sites in Uzbekistan and identified 2 individuals as belonging to haplogroup L1a. One of these specimens was found in Bustan and the other in Sappali Tepe; both ascertained to be Bronze Age sites.
- Skourtanioti et al. (2020) analyzed skeletons from Alalakh and identified one individual (ALA084) c. 2006-1777 BC as belonging to haplogroup L-L595 (L2). Ingman et al. (2021) analyzed more skeletons from Alalakh and identified another individual belonging to haplogroup L-M349 (L1b).
- One Iron Age individual from Batman in Upper Mesopotamia (present-day Southeastern Turkey) belonged to haplogroup L2-L595.
- An ancient Viking individual that lived in Öland, Sweden circa 847 ± 65 CE was determined to belong to L-L595.

=== Chalcolithic South Caucasus ===
Areni-1 Cave
Property	Areni-I	Areni-II	Areni-III
ID	AR1/44 I1634	AR1/46 I1632	ARE12 I1407
Y DNA	L1a	L1a1-M27	L1a
Population	Chalcolithic (Horizon III)	Chalcolithic (Horizon III)	Chalcolithic (Horizon II)
Language			
Culture	Late Chalcolithic	Late Chalcolithic	Late Chalcolithic
Date (YBP)	6161 ± 89	6086 ± 72	6025 ± 325
Burial / Location	Burial 2 / Areni-1 Cave	Burial 3 / Areni-1 Cave	Trench 2A, Unit 7, Square S33/T33, Locus 9, Spit 23 / Areni-1 Cave
Members / Sample Size	1/3	1/3	1/3
Percentage	33.3%	33.3%	33.3%
mtDNA	H2a1	K1a8	H*
Isotope Sr			
Eye color (HIrisPlex System)	Likely Blue		
Hair color (HIrisPlex System)	Likely Red		
Skin pigmentation	Likely light		
ABO Blood Group	Likely O or B		
Diet (d13C%0 / d15N%0)			
FADS activity			
Lactase Persistence	Likely lactose-intolerant		
Oase-1 Shared DNA			
Ostuni1 Shared DNA			
Neanderthal Vi33.26 Shared DNA			
Neanderthal Vi33.25 Shared DNA			
Neanderthal Vi33.16 Shared DNA			
Ancestral Component (AC)			
puntDNAL K12 Ancient			
Dodecad [dv3]			
Eurogenes [K=36]			
Dodecad [Globe13]			
Genetic Distance			
Parental Consanguinity			
Age at Death	11 ± 2.5	15 ± 2.5	
Death Position			
SNPs			
Read Pairs			
Sample			
Source			
Notes	World's earliest evidence of footwear and wine making		

== Nomenclature ==
Prior to 2002, there were in academic literature at least seven naming systems for the Y-Chromosome Phylogenetic tree. This led to considerable confusion. In 2002, the major research groups came together and formed the Y-Chromosome Consortium (YCC). They published a joint paper that created a single new tree that all agreed to use. Later, a group of citizen scientists with an interest in population genetics and genetic genealogy formed a working group to create an amateur tree aiming at being above all timely. The table below brings together all of these works at the point of the landmark 2002 YCC Tree. This allows a researcher reviewing older published literature to quickly move between nomenclatures.

YCC 2002/2008 (Shorthand)	(α)	(β)	(γ)	(δ)	(ε)	(ζ)	(η)	YCC 2002 (Longhand)	YCC 2005 (Longhand)	YCC 2008 (Longhand)	YCC 2010r (Longhand)	ISOGG 2006	ISOGG 2007	ISOGG 2008	ISOGG 2009	ISOGG 2010	ISOGG 2011	ISOGG 2012
L-M20	28	VIII	1U	27	Eu17	H5	F	L*	L	L	L	-	-	-	-	-	-	-
L-M27	28	VIII	1U	27	Eu17	H5	F	L1	L1	L1	L1	-	-	-	-	-	-	-

The Y-Chromosome Consortium tree

This is the official scientific tree produced by the Y-Chromosome Consortium (YCC). The last major update was in 2008. Subsequent updates have been quarterly and biannual. The current version is a revision of the 2010 update.

Original research publications

The following research teams per their publications were represented in the creation of the YCC Tree.

- α Jobling and Tyler-Smith 2000 and Kaladjieva 2001
- β Underhill 2000
- γ Hammer 2001
- δ Karafet et al. 2001
- ε Semino 2000
- ζ Su 1999
- η Capelli 2001

== See also ==
- Genetic genealogy
- Haplogroup
- Haplotype
- Human Y-chromosome DNA haplogroup
- Molecular phylogeny
- Paragroup
- Subclade
- Y-chromosome haplogroups in populations of the world
- Y-DNA haplogroups by ethnic group
- Y-DNA haplogroups in populations of East and Southeast Asia

== Sources ==
- Abu-Amero KK, Hellani A, González AM, Larruga JM, Cabrera VM, Underhill PA (September 2009). "Saudi Arabian Y-Chromosome diversity and its relationship with nearby regions". BMC Genetics. 10 59. doi:10.1186/1471-2156-10-59. PMC 2759955. PMID 19772609.
- Basu A, Mukherjee N, Roy S, Sengupta S, Banerjee S, Chakraborty M, et al. (October 2003). "Ethnic India: a genomic view, with special reference to peopling and structure". Genome Research. 13 (10): 2277–2290. doi:10.1101/gr.1413403. PMC 403703. PMID 14525929.
- Battaglia V, Fornarino S, Al-Zahery N, Olivieri A, Pala M, Myres NM, et al. (June 2009). "Y-chromosomal evidence of the cultural diffusion of agriculture in Southeast Europe". European Journal of Human Genetics. 17 (6): 820–830. doi:10.1038/ejhg.2008.249. PMC 2947100. PMID 19107149.
- Mahal DG, Matsoukas IG (23 January 2018). "The Geographic Origins of Ethnic Groups in the Indian Subcontinent: Exploring Ancient Footprints with Y-DNA Haplogroups". Frontiers in Genetics. 9 4. doi:10.3389/fgene.2018.00004. PMC 5787057. PMID 29410676.
- Beleza S, Gusmão L, Lopes A, Alves C, Gomes I, Giouzeli M, et al. (March 2006). "Micro-phylogeographic and demographic history of Portuguese male lineages". Annals of Human Genetics. 70 (Pt 2): 181–194. doi:10.1111/j.1529-8817.2005.00221.x. PMID 16626329. S2CID 4652154.
- Boattini A, Castrì L, Sarno S, Useli A, Cioffi M, Sazzini M, et al. (March 2013). "mtDNA variation in East Africa unravels the history of Afro-Asiatic groups". American Journal of Physical Anthropology. 150 (3): 375–385. Bibcode:2013AJPA..150..375B. doi:10.1002/ajpa.22212. PMID 23283748.
- Caciagli L, Bulayeva K, Bulayev O, Bertoncini S, Taglioli L, Pagani L, et al. (December 2009). "The key role of patrilineal inheritance in shaping the genetic variation of Dagestan highlanders". Journal of Human Genetics. 54 (12): 689–694. doi:10.1038/jhg.2009.94. hdl:11577/3233090. PMID 19911015.
- Cadenas AM, Zhivotovsky LA, Cavalli-Sforza LL, Underhill PA, Herrera RJ (March 2008). "Y-chromosome diversity characterizes the Gulf of Oman". European Journal of Human Genetics. 16 (3): 374–386. doi:10.1038/sj.ejhg.5201934. PMID 17928816.
- Cinnioğlu C, King R, Kivisild T, Kalfoğlu E, Atasoy S, Cavalleri GL, et al. (January 2004). "Excavating Y-chromosome haplotype strata in Anatolia". Human Genetics. 114 (2): 127–148. doi:10.1007/s00439-003-1031-4. PMID 14586639. S2CID 10763736.
- Cordaux R, Aunger R, Bentley G, Nasidze I, Sirajuddin SM, Stoneking M (February 2004). "Independent origins of Indian caste and tribal paternal lineages". Current Biology. 14 (3): 231–235. Bibcode:2004CBio...14..231C. doi:10.1016/j.cub.2004.01.024. PMID 14761656. S2CID 5721248.
- Dulik MC, Zhadanov SI, Osipova LP, Askapuli A, Gau L, Gokcumen O, et al. (February 2012). "Mitochondrial DNA and Y chromosome variation provides evidence for a recent common ancestry between Native Americans and Indigenous Altaians". American Journal of Human Genetics. 90 (2): 229–246. Bibcode:2012AmJHG..90..229D. doi:10.1016/j.ajhg.2011.12.014. PMC 3276666. PMID 22281367.
- El-Sibai M, Platt DE, Haber M, Xue Y, Youhanna SC, Wells RS, et al. (November 2009). "Geographical structure of the Y-chromosomal genetic landscape of the Levant: a coastal-inland contrast". Annals of Human Genetics. 73 (Pt 6): 568–581. doi:10.1111/j.1469-1809.2009.00538.x. PMC 3312577. PMID 19686289.
- Fedorova SA, Reidla M, Metspalu E, Metspalu M, Rootsi S, Tambets K, et al. (June 2013). "Autosomal and uniparental portraits of the native populations of Sakha (Yakutia): implications for the peopling of Northeast Eurasia". BMC Evolutionary Biology. 13 (127) 127. Bibcode:2013BMCEE..13..127F. doi:10.1186/1471-2148-13-127. PMC 3695835. PMID 23782551.
- Firasat S, Khaliq S, Mohyuddin A, Papaioannou M, Tyler-Smith C, Underhill PA, et al. (January 2007). "Y-chromosomal evidence for a limited Greek contribution to the Pathan population of Pakistan". European Journal of Human Genetics. 15 (1): 121–126. doi:10.1038/sj.ejhg.5201726. PMC 2588664. PMID 17047675.
- Flores C, Maca-Meyer N, Larruga JM, Cabrera VM, Karadsheh N, Gonzalez AM (2005). "Isolates in a corridor of migrations: a high-resolution analysis of Y-chromosome variation in Jordan". Journal of Human Genetics. 50 (9): 435–441. doi:10.1007/s10038-005-0274-4. PMID 16142507.
- Di Cristofaro J, Pennarun E, Mazières S, Myres NM, Lin AA, Temori SA, et al. (2013). "Afghan Hindu Kush: where Eurasian sub-continent gene flows converge". PLOS ONE. 8 (10) e76748. Bibcode:2013PLoSO...876748D. doi:10.1371/journal.pone.0076748. PMC 3799995. PMID 24204668.
- Di Giacomo F, Luca F, Anagnou N, Ciavarella G, Corbo RM, Cresta M, et al. (September 2003). "Clinal patterns of human Y chromosomal diversity in continental Italy and Greece are dominated by drift and founder effects". Molecular Phylogenetics and Evolution. 28 (3): 387–395. Bibcode:2003MolPE..28..387D. doi:10.1016/S1055-7903(03)00016-2. PMID 12927125.
- Gokcumen O (2008). Ethnohistorical and Genetic Survey of Four Central Anatolian Settlements. University of Pennsylvania. ISBN 978-0-549-80966-1.
- Hammer MF, Karafet TM, Park H, Omoto K, Harihara S, Stoneking M, et al. (January 2006). "Dual origins of the Japanese: common ground for hunter-gatherer and farmer Y chromosomes". Journal of Human Genetics. 51 (1): 47–58. doi:10.1007/s10038-005-0322-0. PMID 16328082. S2CID 6559289.
- Karafet T, Xu L, Du R, Wang W, Feng S, Wells RS, et al. (September 2001). "Paternal population history of East Asia: sources, patterns, and microevolutionary processes". American Journal of Human Genetics. 69 (3): 615–628. Bibcode:2001AmJHG..69..615K. doi:10.1086/323299. PMC 1235490. PMID 11481588.
- Karafet TM, Hallmark B, Cox MP, Sudoyo H, Downey S, Lansing JS, et al. (August 2010). "Major east-west division underlies Y chromosome stratification across Indonesia". Molecular Biology and Evolution. 27 (8): 1833–1844. doi:10.1093/molbev/msq063. PMID 20207712.
- Kim SH, Kim KC, Shin DJ, Jin HJ, Kwak KD, Han MS, et al. (April 2011). "High frequencies of Y-chromosome haplogroup O2b-SRY465 lineages in Korea: a genetic perspective on the peopling of Korea". Investigative Genetics. 2 (1): 10. doi:10.1186/2041-2223-2-10. PMC 3087676. PMID 21463511.
- Lappalainen T, Laitinen V, Salmela E, Andersen P, Huoponen K, Savontaus ML, et al. (May 2008). "Migration waves to the Baltic Sea region". Annals of Human Genetics. 72 (Pt 3): 337–348. doi:10.1111/j.1469-1809.2007.00429.x. PMID 18294359. S2CID 32079904.
- Larmuseau MH, Vanderheyden N, Jacobs M, Coomans M, Larno L, Decorte R (March 2011). "Micro-geographic distribution of Y-chromosomal variation in the central-western European region Brabant". Forensic Science International. Genetics. 5 (2): 95–99. doi:10.1016/j.fsigen.2010.08.020. PMID 21036685.
- Kivisild T, Rootsi S, Metspalu M, Mastana S, Kaldma K, Parik J, et al. (February 2003). "The genetic heritage of the earliest settlers persists both in Indian tribal and caste populations". American Journal of Human Genetics. 72 (2): 313–332. Bibcode:2003AmJHG..72..313K. doi:10.1086/346068. PMC 379225. PMID 12536373.
- Larmuseau MH, Ottoni C, Raeymaekers JA, Vanderheyden N, Larmuseau HF, Decorte R (April 2012). "Temporal differentiation across a West-European Y-chromosomal cline: genealogy as a tool in human population genetics". European Journal of Human Genetics. 20 (4): 434–440. doi:10.1038/ejhg.2011.218. PMC 3306861. PMID 22126748.
- Lobov AS, et al. (2009). "Structure of the Gene Pool of Bashkir Subpopulations" (PDF) (in Russian). Archived from the original (PDF) on 16 August 2011.
- Luis JR, Rowold DJ, Regueiro M, Caeiro B, Cinnioğlu C, Roseman C, et al. (March 2004). "The Levant versus the Horn of Africa: evidence for bidirectional corridors of human migrations". American Journal of Human Genetics. 74 (3): 532–544. doi:10.1086/382286. PMC 1182266. PMID 14973781.
- Malyarchuk B, Derenko M, Denisova G, Khoyt S, Woźniak M, Grzybowski T, et al. (December 2013). "Y-chromosome diversity in the Kalmyks at the ethnical and tribal levels". Journal of Human Genetics. 58 (12): 804–811. doi:10.1038/jhg.2013.108. PMID 24132124.
- Pichler I, Mueller JC, Stefanov SA, De Grandi A, Volpato CB, Pinggera GK, et al. (December 2009). "Genetic structure in contemporary South Tyrolean isolated populations revealed by analysis of Y-chromosome, mtDNA, and Alu polymorphisms. 2006". Human Biology. 81 (5–6): 875–898. doi:10.3378/027.081.0629. PMID 20504204. S2CID 46073270.
- Qamar R, Ayub Q, Mohyuddin A, Helgason A, Mazhar K, Mansoor A, et al. (May 2002). "Y-chromosomal DNA variation in Pakistan". American Journal of Human Genetics. 70 (5): 1107–1124. doi:10.1086/339929. PMC 447589. PMID 11898125.
- Regueiro M, Cadenas AM, Gayden T, Underhill PA, Herrera RJ (2006). "Iran: tricontinental nexus for Y-chromosome driven migration". Human Heredity. 61 (3): 132–143. doi:10.1159/000093774. PMID 16770078. S2CID 7017701.
- Sahoo S, Singh A, Himabindu G, Banerjee J, Sitalaximi T, Gaikwad S, et al. (January 2006). "A prehistory of Indian Y chromosomes: evaluating demic diffusion scenarios". Proceedings of the National Academy of Sciences of the United States of America. 103 (4): 843–848. Bibcode:2006PNAS..103..843S. doi:10.1073/pnas.0507714103. PMC 1347984. PMID 16415161.
- Sanchez JJ, Hallenberg C, Børsting C, Hernandez A, Morling N (July 2005). "High frequencies of Y chromosome lineages characterized by E3b1, DYS19-11, DYS392-12 in Somali males". European Journal of Human Genetics. 13 (7): 856–866. doi:10.1038/sj.ejhg.5201390. PMID 15756297.
- Scozzari R, Cruciani F, Pangrazio A, Santolamazza P, Vona G, Moral P, et al. (September 2001). "Human Y-chromosome variation in the western Mediterranean area: implications for the peopling of the region". Human Immunology. 62 (9): 871–884. doi:10.1016/S0198-8859(01)00286-5. PMID 11543889.
- Semino O, Passarino G, Oefner PJ, Lin AA, Arbuzova S, Beckman LE, et al. (November 2000). "The genetic legacy of Paleolithic Homo sapiens sapiens in extant Europeans: a Y chromosome perspective". Science. 290 (5494): 1155–1159. Bibcode:2000Sci...290.1155S. doi:10.1126/science.290.5494.1155. PMID 11073453.
- Sengupta S, Zhivotovsky LA, King R, Mehdi SQ, Edmonds CA, Chow CE, et al. (February 2006). "Polarity and temporality of high-resolution y-chromosome distributions in India identify both indigenous and exogenous expansions and reveal minor genetic influence of Central Asian pastoralists". American Journal of Human Genetics. 78 (2): 202–221. Bibcode:2006AmJHG..78..202S. doi:10.1086/499411. PMC 1380230. PMID 16400607.
- Shah AM, Tamang R, Moorjani P, Rani DS, Govindaraj P, Kulkarni G, et al. (July 2011). "Indian Siddis: African descendants with Indian admixture". American Journal of Human Genetics. 89 (1): 154–161. doi:10.1016/j.ajhg.2011.05.030. PMC 3135801. PMID 21741027.
- Tarkhnishvili D, Gavashelishvili A, Murtskhvaladze M, Gabelaia M, Tevzadze G (2014). "Human paternal lineages, languages, and environment in the Caucasus". Human Biology. 86 (2): 113–130. doi:10.3378/027.086.0205. PMID 25397702. S2CID 7733899.
- Thanseem I, Thangaraj K, Chaubey G, Singh VK, Bhaskar LV, Reddy BM, et al. (August 2006). "Genetic affinities among the lower castes and tribal groups of India: inference from Y chromosome and mitochondrial DNA". BMC Genetics. 7 42. doi:10.1186/1471-2156-7-42. PMC 1569435. PMID 16893451.
- Thomas MG, Barnes I, Weale ME, Jones AL, Forster P, Bradman N, et al. (January 2008). "New genetic evidence supports isolation and drift in the Ladin communities of the South Tyrolean Alps but not an ancient origin in the Middle East". European Journal of Human Genetics. 16 (1): 124–134. doi:10.1038/sj.ejhg.5201906. PMID 17712356.
- Weale ME, Yepiskoposyan L, Jager RF, Hovhannisyan N, Khudoyan A, Burbage-Hall O, et al. (December 2001). "Armenian Y chromosome haplotypes reveal strong regional structure within a single ethno-national group". Human Genetics. 109 (6): 659–674. doi:10.1007/s00439-001-0627-9. PMID 11810279. S2CID 23113666.
- Wells RS, Yuldasheva N, Ruzibakiev R, Underhill PA, Evseeva I, Blue-Smith J, et al. (August 2001). "The Eurasian heartland: a continental perspective on Y-chromosome diversity". Proceedings of the National Academy of Sciences of the United States of America. 98 (18): 10244–10249. Bibcode:2001PNAS...9810244W. doi:10.1073/pnas.171305098. PMC 56946. PMID 11526236.
- Young KL, Sun G, Deka R, Crawford MH (August 2011). "Paternal genetic history of the Basque population of Spain". Human Biology. 83 (4): 455–475. doi:10.3378/027.083.0402. hdl:1808/16387. PMID 21846204. S2CID 3191418.
- Zalloua PA, Xue Y, Khalife J, Makhoul N, Debiane L, Platt DE, et al. (April 2008). "Y-chromosomal diversity in Lebanon is structured by recent historical events". American Journal of Human Genetics. 82 (4): 873–882. doi:10.1016/j.ajhg.2008.01.020. PMC 2427286. PMID 18374297.

=== Sources for conversion tables ===
- Capelli C, Wilson JF, Richards M, Stumpf MP, Gratrix F, Oppenheimer S, et al. (February 2001). "A predominantly indigenous paternal heritage for the Austronesian-speaking peoples of insular Southeast Asia and Oceania". American Journal of Human Genetics. 68 (2): 432–443. doi:10.1086/318205. PMC 1235276. PMID 11170891.
- Hammer MF, Karafet TM, Redd AJ, Jarjanazi H, Santachiara-Benerecetti S, Soodyall H, et al. (July 2001). "Hierarchical patterns of global human Y-chromosome diversity". Molecular Biology and Evolution. 18 (7): 1189–1203. doi:10.1093/oxfordjournals.molbev.a003906. PMID 11420360.
- Jobling MA, Tyler-Smith C (August 2000). "New uses for new haplotypes the human Y chromosome, disease and selection". Trends in Genetics. 16 (8): 356–362. doi:10.1016/S0168-9525(00)02057-6. PMID 10904265.
- Kalaydjieva L, Calafell F, Jobling MA, Angelicheva D, de Knijff P, Rosser ZH, et al. (February 2001). "Patterns of inter- and intra-group genetic diversity in the Vlax Roma as revealed by Y chromosome and mitochondrial DNA lineages". European Journal of Human Genetics. 9 (2): 97–104. doi:10.1038/sj.ejhg.5200597. PMID 11313742. S2CID 21432405.
- Karafet T, Xu L, Du R, Wang W, Feng S, Wells RS, et al. (September 2001). "Paternal population history of East Asia: sources, patterns, and microevolutionary processes". American Journal of Human Genetics. 69 (3): 615–628. Bibcode:2001AmJHG..69..615K. doi:10.1086/323299. PMC 1235490. PMID 11481588.
- Karafet TM, Mendez FL, Meilerman MB, Underhill PA, Zegura SL, Hammer MF (May 2008). "New binary polymorphisms reshape and increase resolution of the human Y chromosomal haplogroup tree". Genome Research. 18 (5): 830–838. doi:10.1101/gr.7172008. PMC 2336805. PMID 18385274.
- Su B, Xiao J, Underhill P, Deka R, Zhang W, Akey J, et al. (December 1999). "Y-Chromosome evidence for a northward migration of modern humans into Eastern Asia during the last Ice Age". American Journal of Human Genetics. 65 (6): 1718–1724. Bibcode:1999AmJHG..65.1718S. doi:10.1086/302680. PMC 1288383. PMID 10577926.
- Underhill PA, Shen P, Lin AA, Jin L, Passarino G, Yang WH, et al. (November 2000). "Y chromosome sequence variation and the history of human populations". Nature Genetics. 26 (3): 358–361. doi:10.1038/81685. PMID 11062480. S2CID 12893406.
- Yunusbaev BB (2006). ПОПУЛЯЦИОННО-ГЕНЕТИЧЕСКОЕ ИССЛЕДОВАНИЕ НАРОДОВ ДАГЕСТАНА ПО ДАННЫМ О ПОЛИМОРФИЗМЕ У-ХРОМОСОМЫ И АТД-ИНСЕРЦИЙ [Population-genetic study of the peoples of Dagestan on the data on Y-chromosome and ATD-insertion polymorphism] (PDF) (PhD). Moscow: Russian Academy of Sciences. Archived from the original (PDF) on 5 February 2007.
- Zhong H, Shi H, Qi XB, Duan ZY, Tan PP, Jin L, et al. (January 2011). "Extended Y chromosome investigation suggests postglacial migrations of modern humans into East Asia via the northern route". Molecular Biology and Evolution. 28 (1): 717–727. doi:10.1093/molbev/msq247. PMID 20837606.
