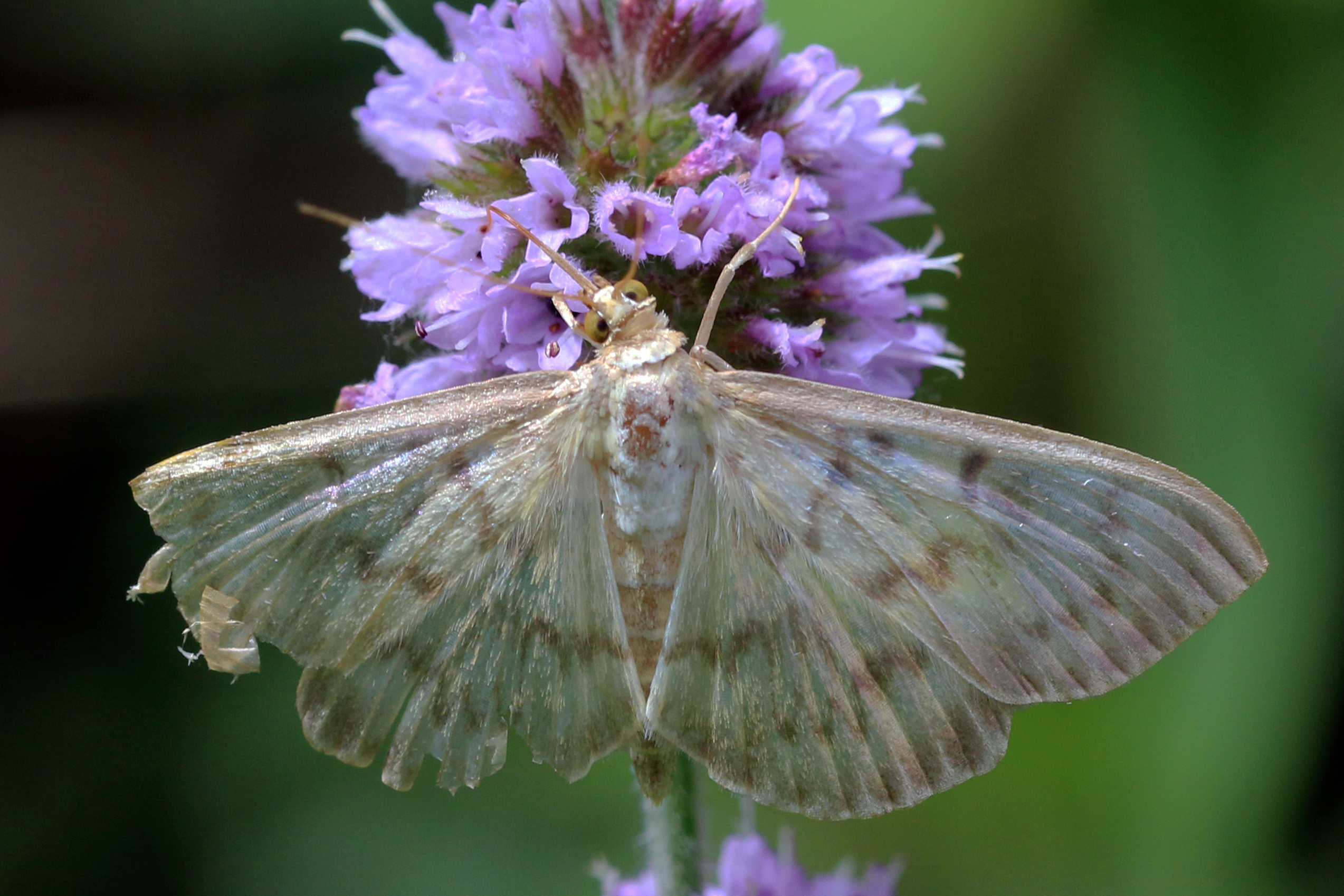

Scientific classification
- Kingdom: Animalia
- Phylum: Arthropoda
- Clade: Pancrustacea
- Class: Insecta
- Order: Lepidoptera
- Family: Crambidae
- Genus: Patania
- Species: P. ruralis

Binomial name
- Patania ruralis (Scopoli, 1763)

Synonyms
- List: Phalaena ruralis Scopoli, 1763; Syllepta ruralis; Pleuroptya ruralis; Pleuroptya conchalis Werneburg, 1864; Pleuroptya ruralis dubia (Hampson, 1891); Pleuroptya ruralis flavescens (Rebel, 1916); Pleuroptya iridialis Hübner, 1825

= Patania ruralis =

Species of moth

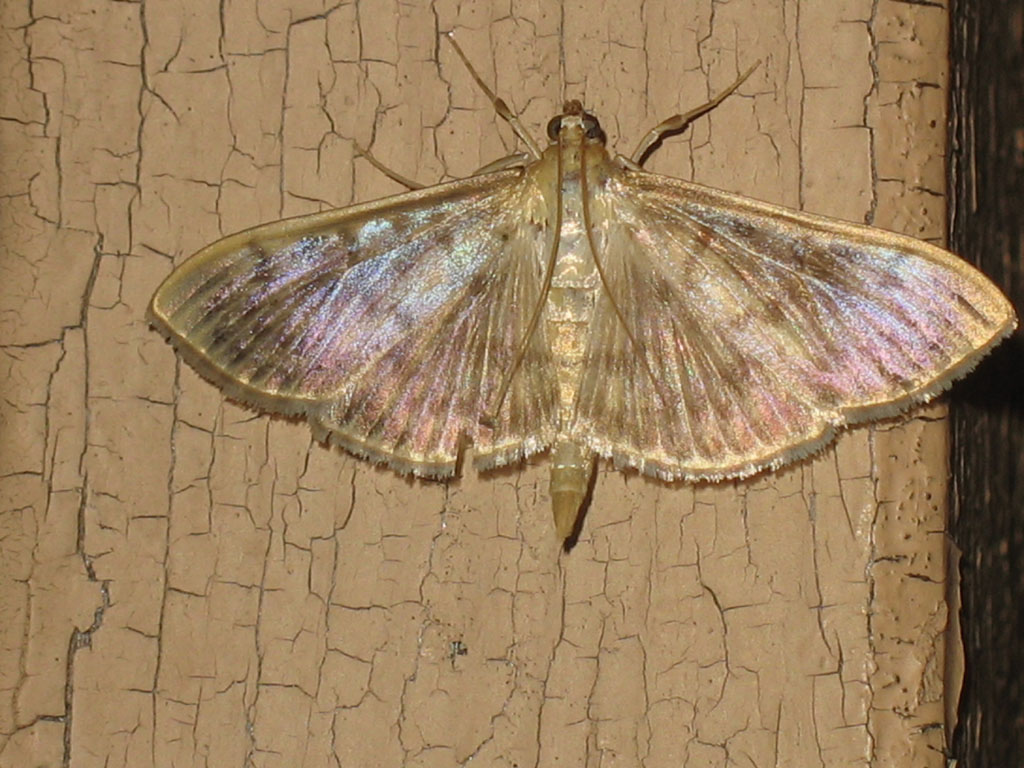
Adult near Antsiferovo, Moscow Oblast, showing the characteristic sheen

Patania ruralis, the mother of pearl moth, is a species of moth in the grass moth family Crambidae. It was described by Giovanni Antonio Scopoli in 1763. Its common name refers to its almost transparent wings which in oblique lighting show a pale blue pearlescent sheen. This is found in Europe, occurring almost across the continent and the nearshore islands, except for those in the Aegean and Western Mediterranean as well as Cyprus. The adults are on the wing from June to September depending on the location. The caterpillars eat mainly Urtica nettles; occasionally they are found on other eudicots.

== Description and ecology ==
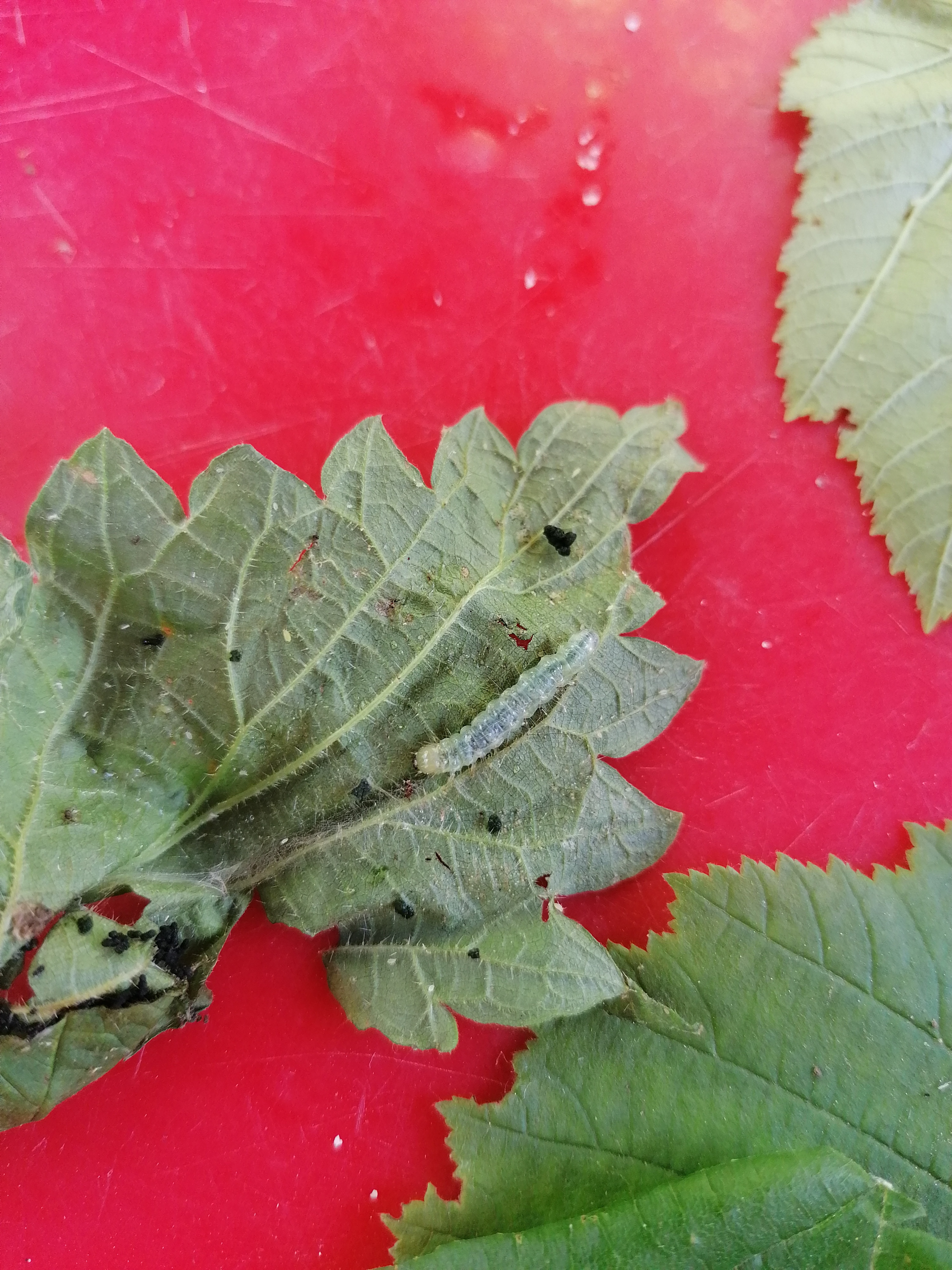
Caterpillar on a nettle leaf

The wingspan is 26–40 millimetres (1.0–1.6 in). The forewings are pale whitish-ochreous, yellowish-tinged; a grey subcostal suffusion and connected orbicular dot; lines rather dark grey, first straight, second serrate, curved, strongly broken inwards beneath middle; a dark grey discal mark, nearly followed by a grey blotch; a grey terminal band, edge parallel to second line. Hindwings with colour, discal mark, and posterior markings as in forewings. The caterpillar larva is whitish green, sides greener; dorsal line darker; head green.

The larvae feed mainly on stinging nettle (Urtica dioica), as well as small nettle (U.urens). Less often they have been found on hops (Humulus lupulus), another member of the urticalean (nettle) clade of the Rosales. From the Caryophyllales, goosefoot (Chenopodium) and orache (Atriplex) have been recorded as occasional foodplants. They are notable for their rolling locomotion; the rolling behaviour of the caterpillar has been used as a model to create next-generation robots that roll.
