= Antsiferovo =

Antsiferovo may refer to:

- Antsiferovo, Krasnoyarsk Krai, a village in Krasnoyarsk Krai, Russia
- Antsiferovo, Moscow Oblast, a village in Moscow Oblast, Russia
- Antsiferovo, Anstiferovskoye Settlement, Khvoyninsky District, Novgorod Oblast, a village (selo) in Antsiferovskoye Settlement of Khvoyninsky District of Novgorod Oblast, Russia
- Antsiferovo, Brodskoye Settlement, Khvoyninsky District, Novgorod Oblast, a village in Brodskoye Settlement of Khvoyninsky District of Novgorod Oblast, Russia
- Antsiferovo, Tver Oblast, a village in Tver Oblast, Russia
- Antsiferovo, name of several other rural localities in Russia
