= Qinggir =

Coordinates: 41°28′N 88°46′E

Qinggir (Chinese: 辛格尔; pinyin: Xīngé'ěr) is a populated place in the Xinjiang Uyghur Autonomous Region of China. It is located on the border of Toksun County and Yuli County, northwest of the former Lake Lop Nur.

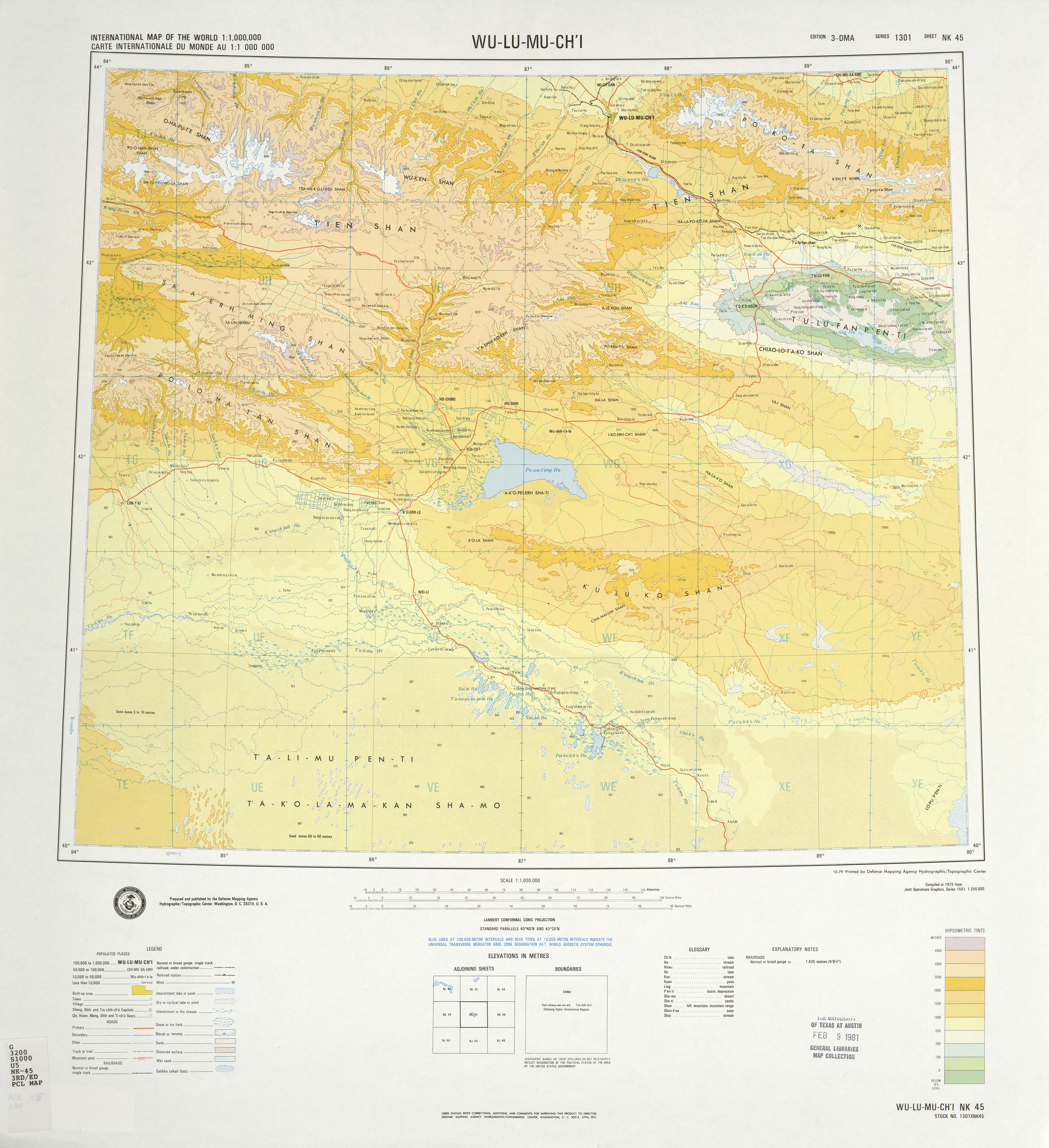
Map including Qinggir (labeled as Hsin-ko-erh) (DMA, 1975)

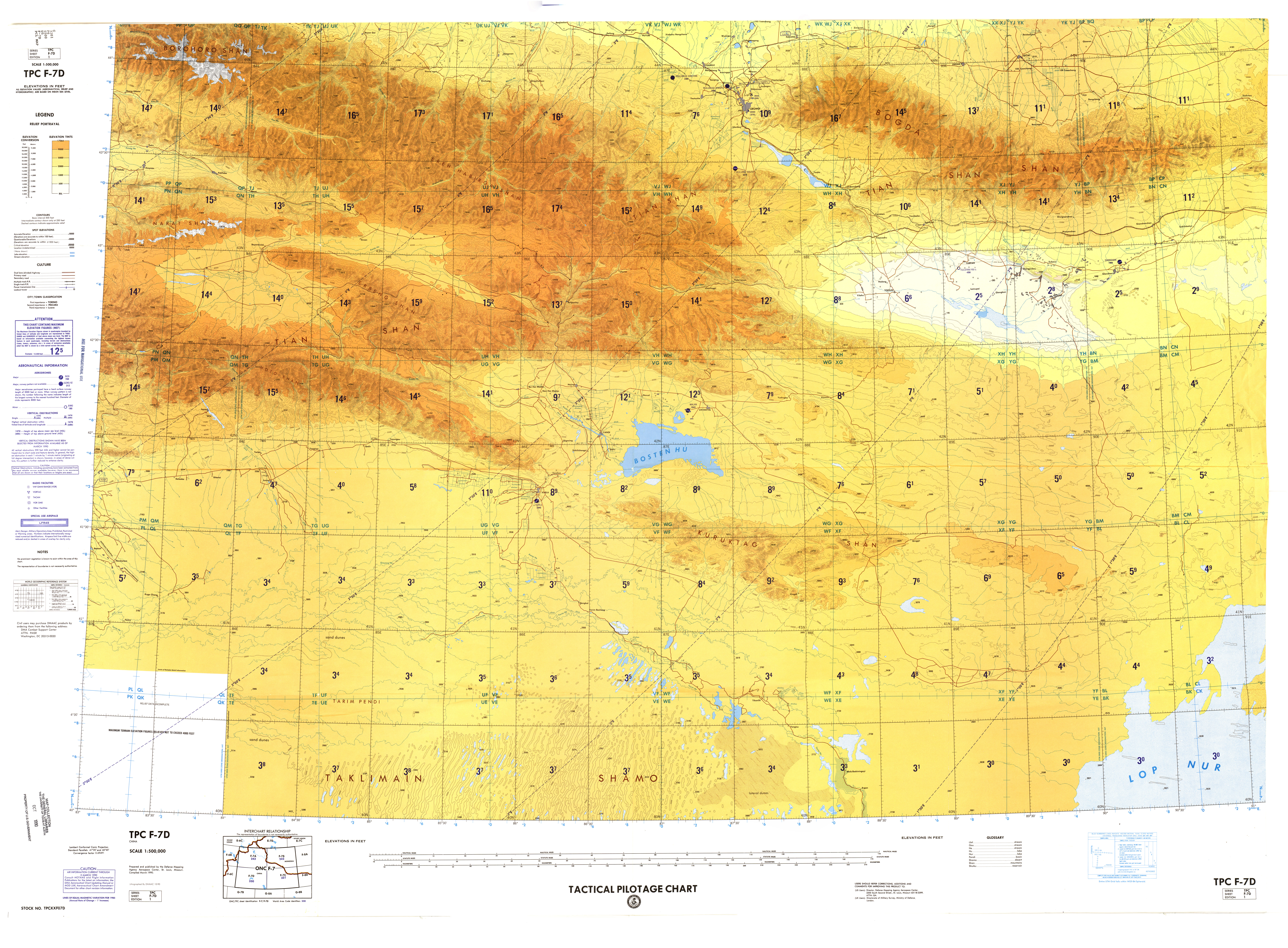
Map including Qinggir (DMA, 1990)

The Qinggir region in Lop Nur is used for vertical shaft nuclear weapons testing.
