= Yuli County =

Yuli County 尉犁县 (Chinese) لوپنۇر ناھىيىسى (Uyghur) ᠯᠣᠪ ᠨᠠᠭᠤᠷ ᠰᠢᠶᠠᠨ (Mongolian) Yülihsien, Lopnur
- County
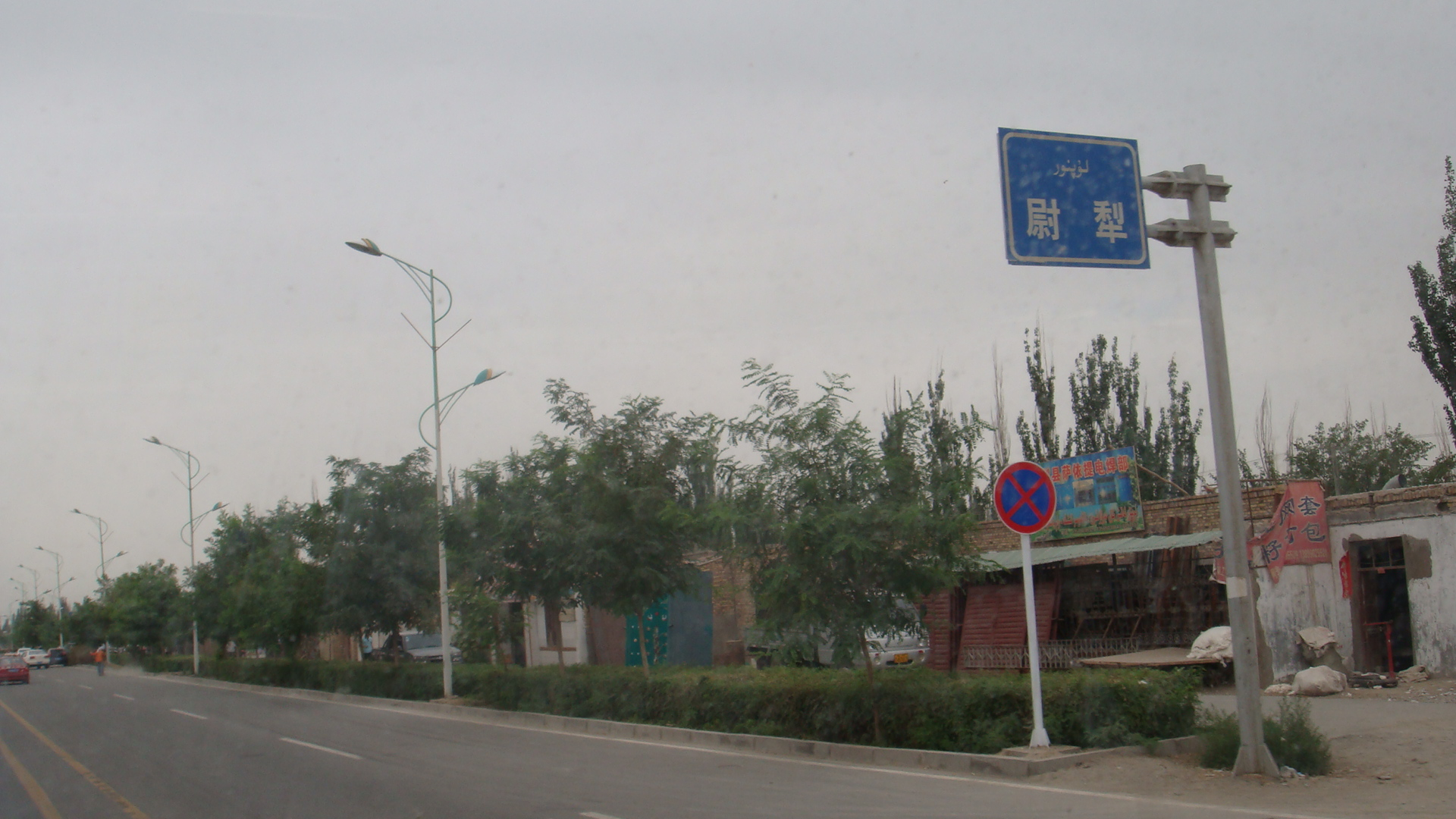

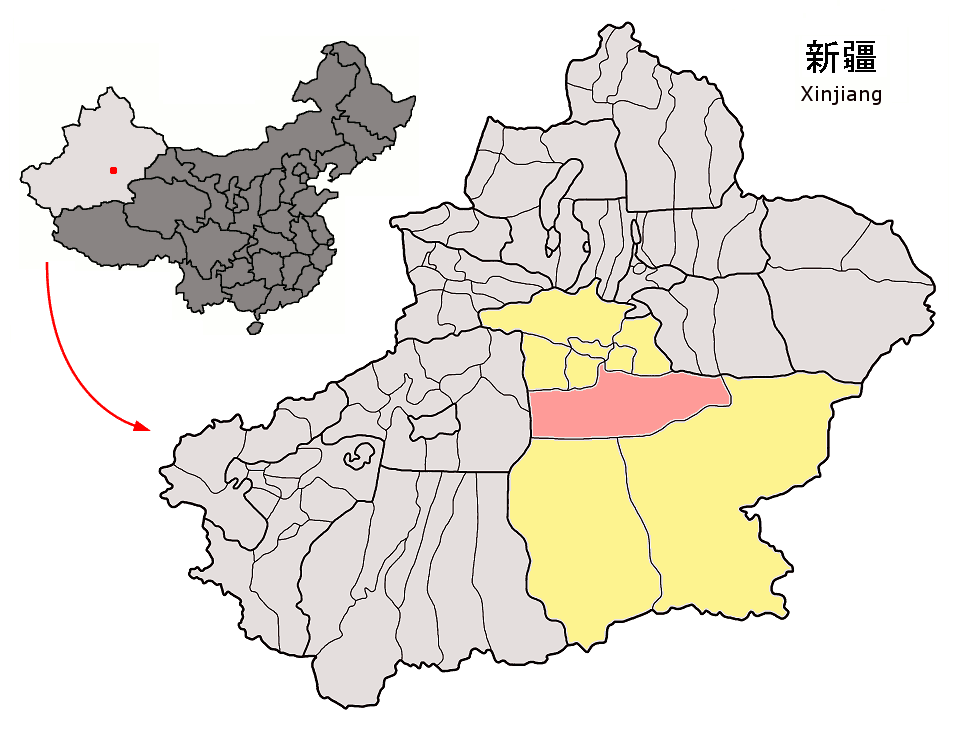
- Yuli County (red) within Bayingolin Prefecture (yellow) and Xinjiang

- Location of the seat in Xinjiang Yuli (Xinjiang) Yuli (China)
- Coordinates: 41°20′38″N 86°15′40″E
- Country: China
- Autonomous region: Xinjiang
- Autonomous prefecture: Bayingolin
- County seat: Yuli (Lopnur)

Area
  - Total: 59,401.78 km^{2} (22,935.16 sq mi)

Population (2020)
  - Total: 101,866
  - Density: 1.71486/km^{2} (4.44148/sq mi)

Ethnic groups
  - Major ethnic groups: Han Chinese, Uyghur
- Time zone: UTC+8 (China Standard (Note: Locals in Xinjiang frequently observe UTC+6 (Xinjiang Time), 2 hours behind Beijing.))
- Postal code: 841500
- Website: yuli.gov.cn (in Chinese)

Yuli County

Chinese name
- Simplified Chinese: 尉犁县
- Traditional Chinese: 尉犁縣
Transcriptions
Standard Mandarin
- Hanyu Pinyin: Yùlí Xiàn
- Wade–Giles: Yü⁴-li² Hsien⁴

Alternative Chinese name
- Simplified Chinese: 罗布淖尔县
- Traditional Chinese: 羅布淖爾縣
Transcriptions
Standard Mandarin
- Hanyu Pinyin: Luóbùnào'ěr Xiàn

Second alternative Chinese name
- Simplified Chinese: 罗布泊县
- Traditional Chinese: 羅布泊縣
Transcriptions
Standard Mandarin
- Hanyu Pinyin: Luóbùpō Xiàn

Mongolian name
- Mongolian script: ᠯᠣᠪ ᠨᠠᠭᠤᠷ ᠰᠢᠶᠠᠨ

Uyghur name
- Uyghur: لوپنۇر ناھىيىسى
Transcriptions
- Latin Yëziqi: Lopnur Nahiyisi
- Yengi Yeziⱪ: Lopnur Naⱨiyisi
- SASM/GNC: Lopnur Nahiyisi
- Siril Yëziqi: Лопнур наһийиси

Yuli County as the official Romanized name, also transliterated from Mongolian as Lopnur County (Lop Nur), is a county in the Xinjiang Uyghur Autonomous Region and is under the administration of the Bayin'gholin Mongol Autonomous Prefecture. It contains an area of 59,399 km^{2} (22,934 sq mi). According to the 2002 census, it has a population of 100,000.

== Etymology ==
The etymology was discussed in detail in the article On the Place Name Yuli and Rouran (尉犁地名和柔然源流考) by Li Shuhui (李树辉).

The name Yuli was postulated to have come from Turkic (J)yrægir ("one who is stationed; one who stays"), the name of a Turkic clan, and derived from yræ-(verb form yryk, "to be stationed in") + -gir (adjectival suffix).

Both (J)yrægir and yryk were said to be recorded in the ancient dictionary Dīwān Lughāt al-Turk, although the exact Arabic-script forms are unknown, perhaps اُرَكِرْ Üregir, يُرَكِرْ Yüregir, the 15th clan of the Oghuz.

== History ==
In 2016, Tuanjie was upgraded from a township to a town.

In 2018, Xingping was upgraded from a township to a town.

== Geography ==
The county is bordered to the northeast by Toksun County.

== Climate ==
Climate data for Yuli, elevation 885 m (2,904 ft), (1991–2020 normals, extremes 1972–present)
Month	Jan	Feb	Mar	Apr	May	Jun	Jul	Aug	Sep	Oct	Nov	Dec	Year
Record high °C (°F)	8.5 (47.3)	16.8 (62.2)	28.7 (83.7)	36.4 (97.5)	37.5 (99.5)	39.2 (102.6)	44.1 (111.4)	42.2 (108.0)	38.4 (101.1)	31.6 (88.9)	21.0 (69.8)	11.3 (52.3)	44.1 (111.4)
Mean daily maximum °C (°F)	−0.8 (30.6)	6.6 (43.9)	15.5 (59.9)	23.9 (75.0)	28.9 (84.0)	32.6 (90.7)	33.9 (93.0)	32.9 (91.2)	28.3 (82.9)	20.6 (69.1)	10.5 (50.9)	0.8 (33.4)	19.5 (67.1)
Daily mean °C (°F)	−8.5 (16.7)	−1.6 (29.1)	7.5 (45.5)	16.0 (60.8)	21.2 (70.2)	25.2 (77.4)	26.4 (79.5)	24.9 (76.8)	19.4 (66.9)	10.7 (51.3)	1.7 (35.1)	−6.4 (20.5)	11.4 (52.5)
Mean daily minimum °C (°F)	−14.9 (5.2)	−9.1 (15.6)	−0.4 (31.3)	8.1 (46.6)	13.4 (56.1)	18.1 (64.6)	19.6 (67.3)	17.9 (64.2)	12.0 (53.6)	3.1 (37.6)	−5.0 (23.0)	−12.0 (10.4)	4.2 (39.6)
Record low °C (°F)	−24.0 (−11.2)	−24.2 (−11.6)	−10.8 (12.6)	−3.0 (26.6)	1.6 (34.9)	5.5 (41.9)	11.0 (51.8)	7.7 (45.9)	0.7 (33.3)	−5.7 (21.7)	−15.5 (4.1)	−24.4 (−11.9)	−24.4 (−11.9)
Average precipitation mm (inches)	1.2 (0.05)	0.7 (0.03)	0.9 (0.04)	2.6 (0.10)	6.8 (0.27)	10.3 (0.41)	9.4 (0.37)	7.6 (0.30)	4.0 (0.16)	2.0 (0.08)	1.0 (0.04)	1.1 (0.04)	47.6 (1.89)
Average precipitation days (≥ 0.1 mm)	1.6	0.7	0.5	1.4	2.3	3.7	4.9	3.1	1.8	1.1	0.6	1.6	23.3
Average snowy days	4.9	1.2	0.3	0.1	0	0	0	0	0	0.1	0.6	4.8	12
Average relative humidity (%)	67	51	36	33	34	40	45	48	51	54	58	68	49
Mean monthly sunshine hours	191.9	204.4	240.6	259.9	301.9	304.8	306.8	297.4	282.8	269.1	216.4	176.4	3,052.4
Percentage possible sunshine	64	67	64	64	67	67	68	71	77	80	75	62	69
Source: China Meteorological Administrationall-time record highall-time September high

Climate data for Tieganlike Station, Yuli County, elevation 846 m (2,776 ft), (1991–2020 normals)
Month	Jan	Feb	Mar	Apr	May	Jun	Jul	Aug	Sep	Oct	Nov	Dec	Year
Mean daily maximum °C (°F)	−0.4 (31.3)	7.1 (44.8)	16.1 (61.0)	24.6 (76.3)	30.0 (86.0)	34.1 (93.4)	35.7 (96.3)	34.8 (94.6)	29.5 (85.1)	21.2 (70.2)	10.7 (51.3)	1.0 (33.8)	20.4 (68.7)
Daily mean °C (°F)	−8.6 (16.5)	−1.7 (28.9)	7.6 (45.7)	16.2 (61.2)	21.7 (71.1)	26.2 (79.2)	27.7 (81.9)	26.1 (79.0)	19.8 (67.6)	10.5 (50.9)	1.5 (34.7)	−6.7 (19.9)	11.7 (53.1)
Mean daily minimum °C (°F)	−15.5 (4.1)	−9.4 (15.1)	−0.6 (30.9)	7.9 (46.2)	13.1 (55.6)	18.1 (64.6)	20.0 (68.0)	18.2 (64.8)	11.8 (53.2)	2.7 (36.9)	−5.2 (22.6)	−12.5 (9.5)	4.1 (39.3)
Average precipitation mm (inches)	0.5 (0.02)	0.4 (0.02)	0.9 (0.04)	2.5 (0.10)	4.5 (0.18)	9.3 (0.37)	7.3 (0.29)	5.6 (0.22)	1.3 (0.05)	2.4 (0.09)	0.4 (0.02)	0.8 (0.03)	35.9 (1.43)
Average precipitation days (≥ 0.1 mm)	0.8	0.3	0.3	0.8	2.0	3.1	3.6	2.2	0.9	0.6	0.3	0.9	15.8
Average snowy days	2.8	0.5	0.2	0.1	0	0	0	0	0	0	0.5	2.8	6.9
Average relative humidity (%)	61	47	32	29	30	36	40	41	44	50	55	65	44
Mean monthly sunshine hours	191.1	197.5	228.2	241.9	277.8	276.1	281.9	289.8	275.3	265.1	216.9	177.0	2,918.6
Percentage possible sunshine	63	65	61	60	62	61	62	69	75	79	74	62	66
Source: China Meteorological Administration

== Administrative divisions ==
Yuli County includes three towns and five townships:

Name	Simplified Chinese	Hanyu Pinyin	Uyghur (UEY)	Uyghur Latin (ULY)	Mongolian (traditional)	Mongolian (Cyrillic)	Administrative division code	Notes
Towns
Yuli Town (Lopnur Town)	尉犁镇	Yùlí Zhèn	لوپنۇر بازىرى	lopnur baziri			652823100	
Tuanjie Town	团结镇	Tuánjié Zhèn	ئىتتىپاق بازىرى	Ittipaq baziri			652823110	formerly Tuanjie Township (团结乡)
Xingping Town	兴平镇	Xīngpíng Zhèn	شىڭپىڭ بازىرى	shingping baziri			652823120	formerly Xingping Township (兴平乡)
Townships
Tarim Township	塔里木乡	Tǎlǐmù Xiāng	تارىم يېزىسى	tarim yëzisi			652823200	
Dongkotan Township	墩阔坦乡	Dūnkuòtǎn Xiāng	دۆڭقوتان يېزىسى	döngqotan yëzisi			652823203	
Karquga Township	喀尔曲尕乡	Kā'ěrqūgǎ Xiāng	قارچۇغا يېزىسى	qarchugha yëzisi			652823204	
Aksopi Township	阿克苏普乡 (阿克苏甫乡)	Ākèsūpǔ Xiāng (Ākèsūfǔ Xiāng)	ئاقسوپى يېزىسى	Aqsopi yëzisi			652823205	
Gülbag Township	古勒巴格乡	Gǔlèbāgé Xiāng	گۈلباغ يېزىسى	gülbagh yëzisi			652823206	

Others:

- XPCC 31st Regiment Farm (兵团三十一团, 31-تۇەن مەيدانى)
- XPCC 33rd Regiment Farm (兵团三十三团, 33-تۇەن مەيدانى)
- XPCC 34th Regiment Farm (兵团三十四团, 34-تۇەن مەيدانى)

== Economy ==
As of 1885, there was about 2,960 acres (19,564 mu) of cultivated land in Yuli.

== Demographics ==
As of 2015, 68,281 (66.20%) of the 103,143 residents of the county were Han Chinese, 33,752 (32.72%) were Uyghur and 1,110 were from other ethnic groups.

As of 1999, 70.54% of the population of Yuli (Lopnur) County was Han Chinese and 28.68% of the population was Uyghur.

As of 1997, several townships had a majority of Uyghur residents including Ka'erquga Township (98.6%), Donghetan Township (98.5%), Akesufu/Akesupu Township (90.1%), Gulebage Township (65.3%), Xingping Township (61.6%) and others.

The proportion of nationalities in Yuli (Lopnur) County, 2018
Nationality	Percentage
Han People	66.9%
Uyghurs	32.0%
Hui People	0.5%
Others	0.6%
Source of the population statistics :

== Transportation ==
- China National Highway 218

== Gallery ==
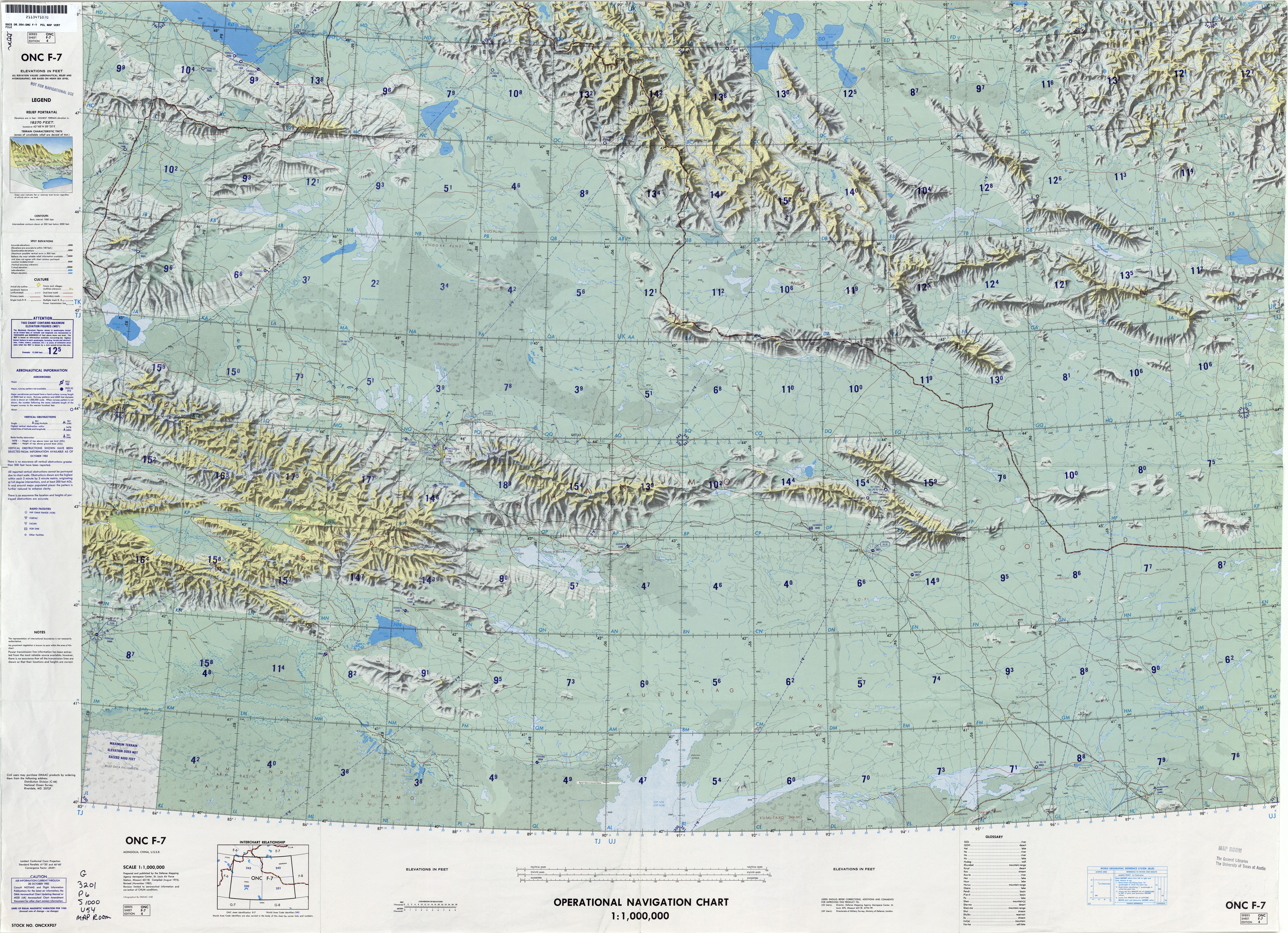
Map including Yuli and surrounding region (DMA, 1982)

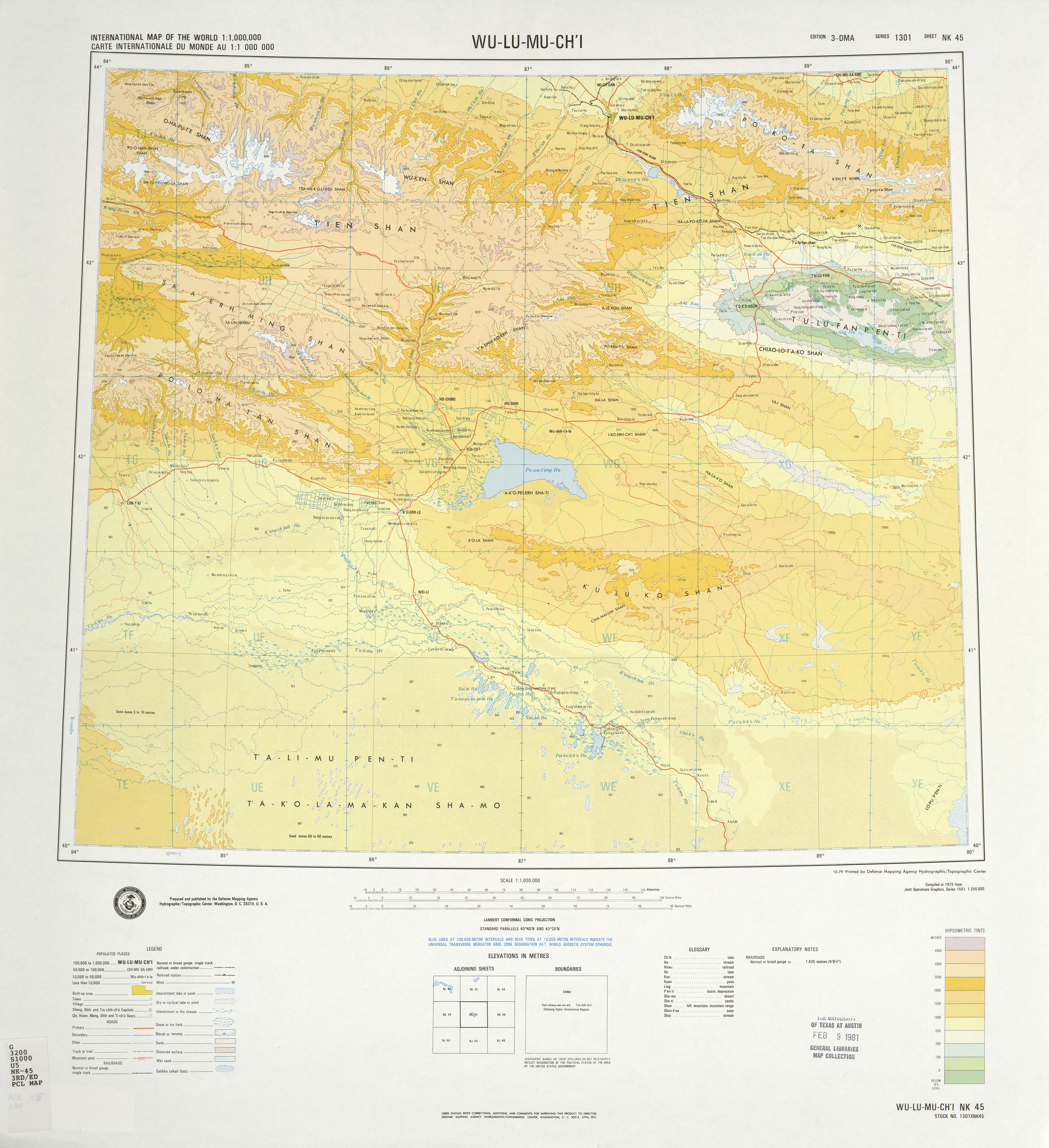
Map including Yuli (labeled as WEI-LI) and surrounding region from the International Map of the World (1975)

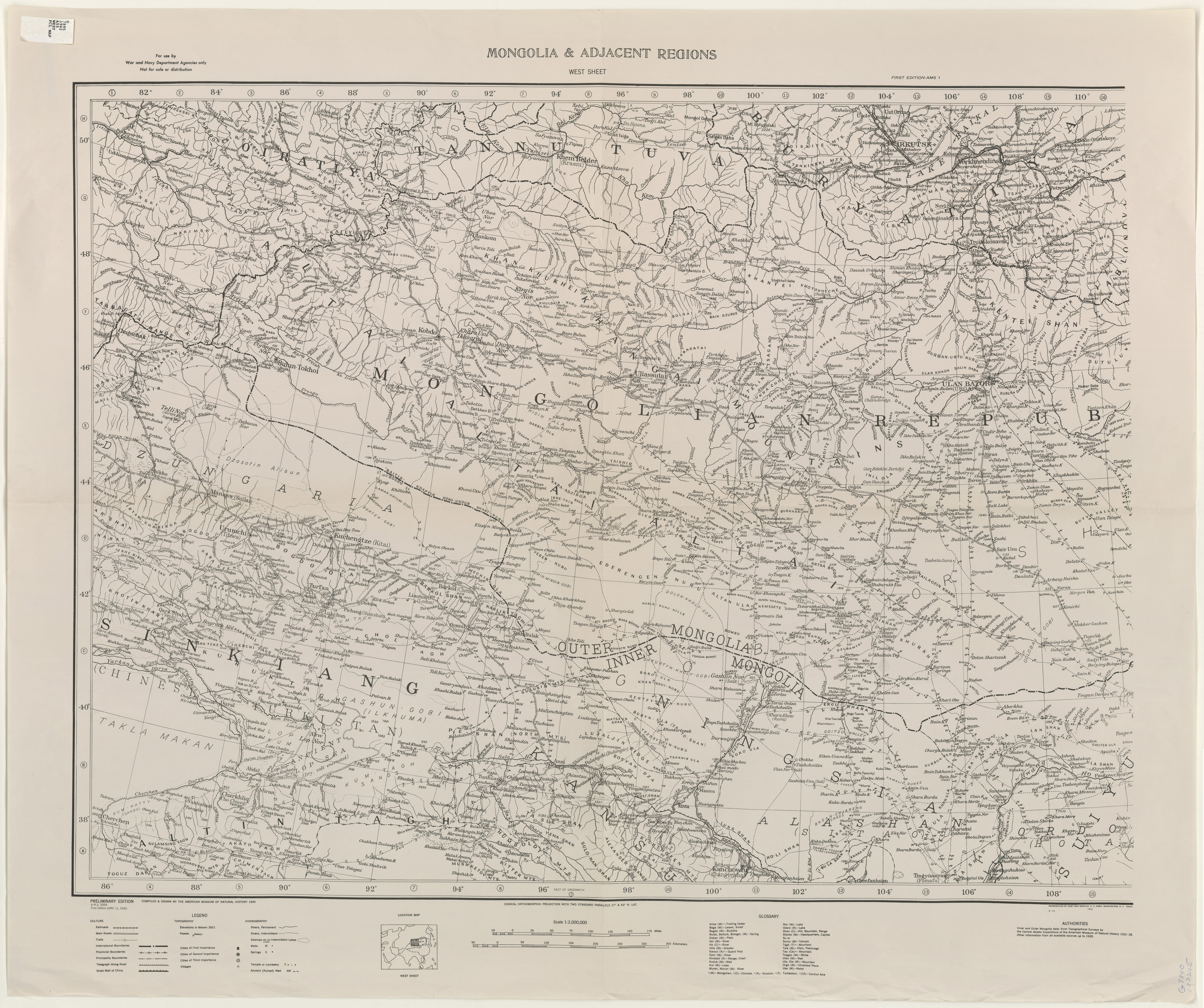
Map including eastern Yuli County area (1935)

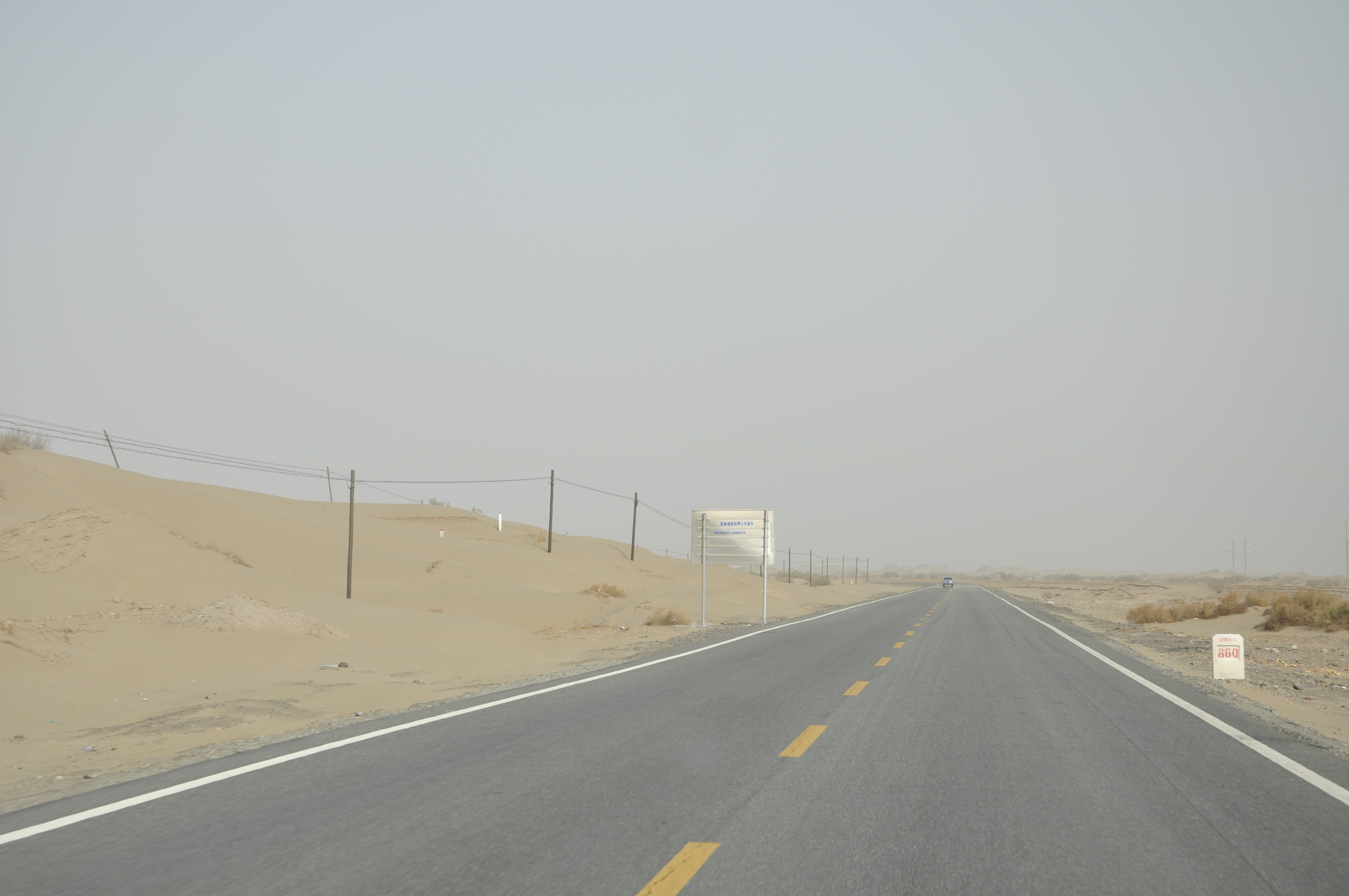

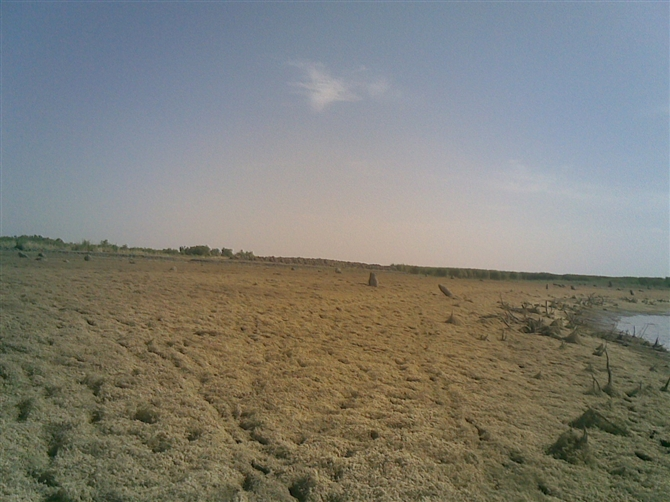

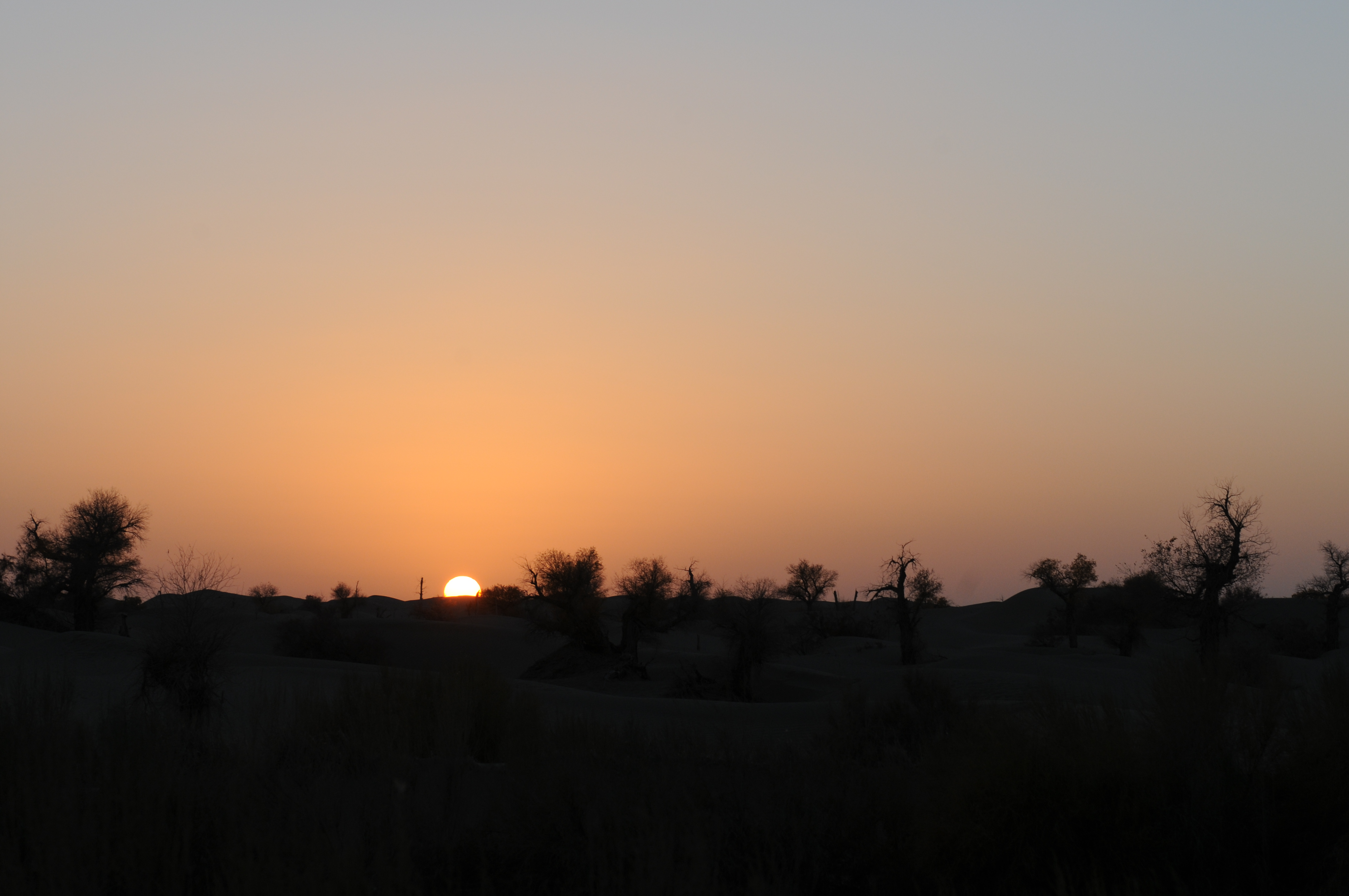

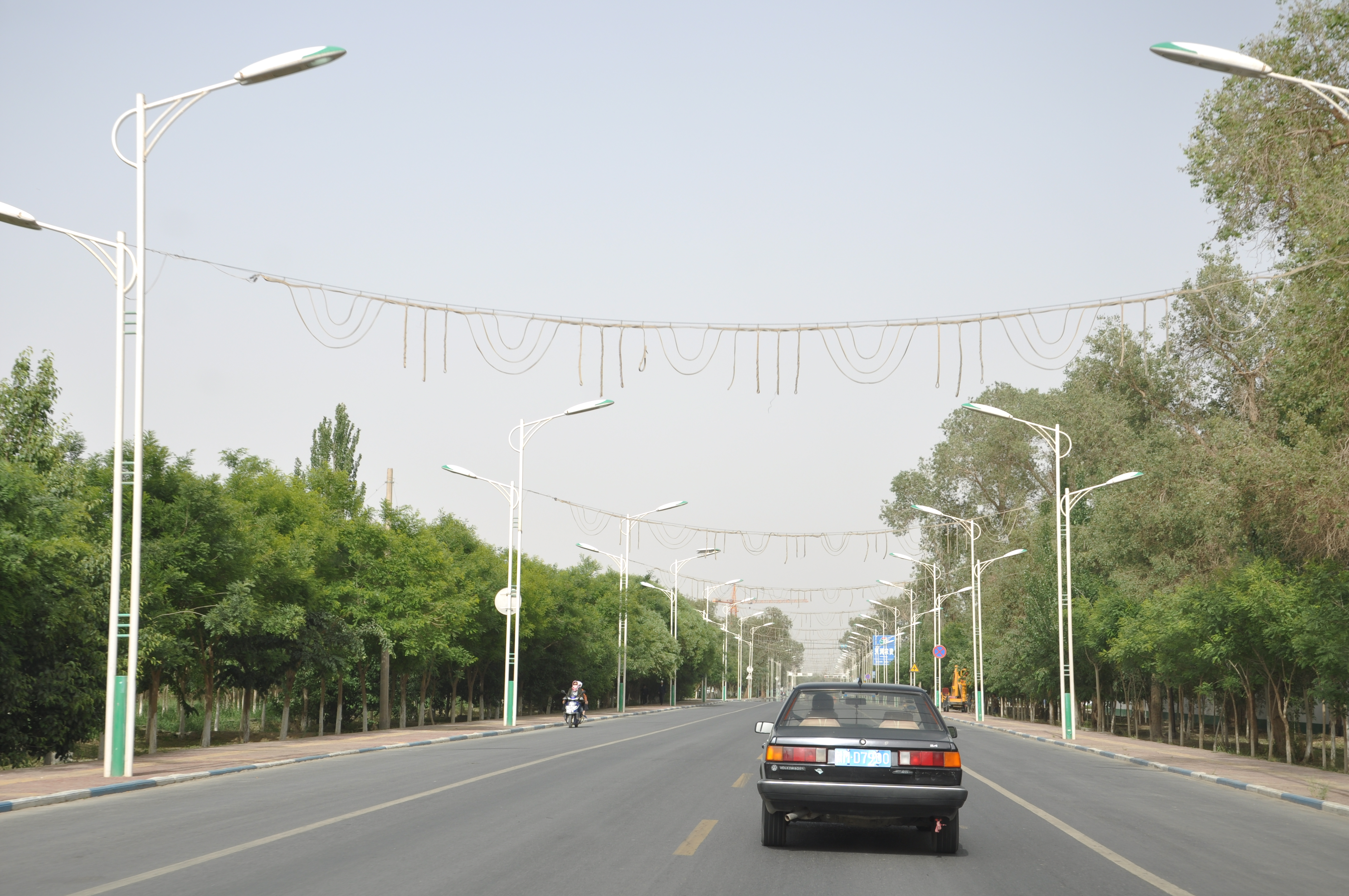

== See also ==
- Qinggir
