= Antsiferovo, Moscow Oblast =

Rural locality in Moscow Oblast, Russia

Coordinates: 55°35′N 38°45′E

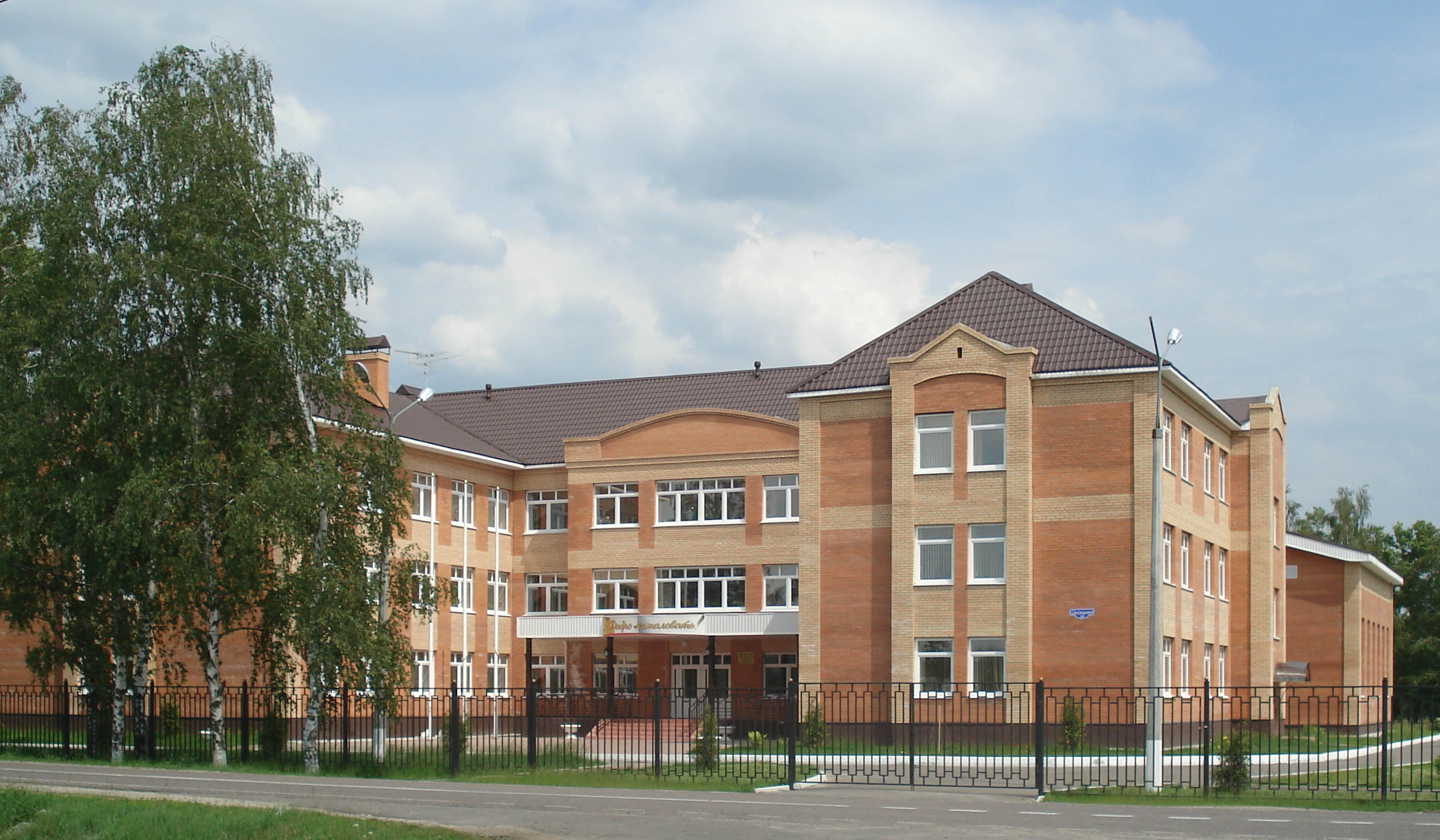
New school building in Antsiferovo

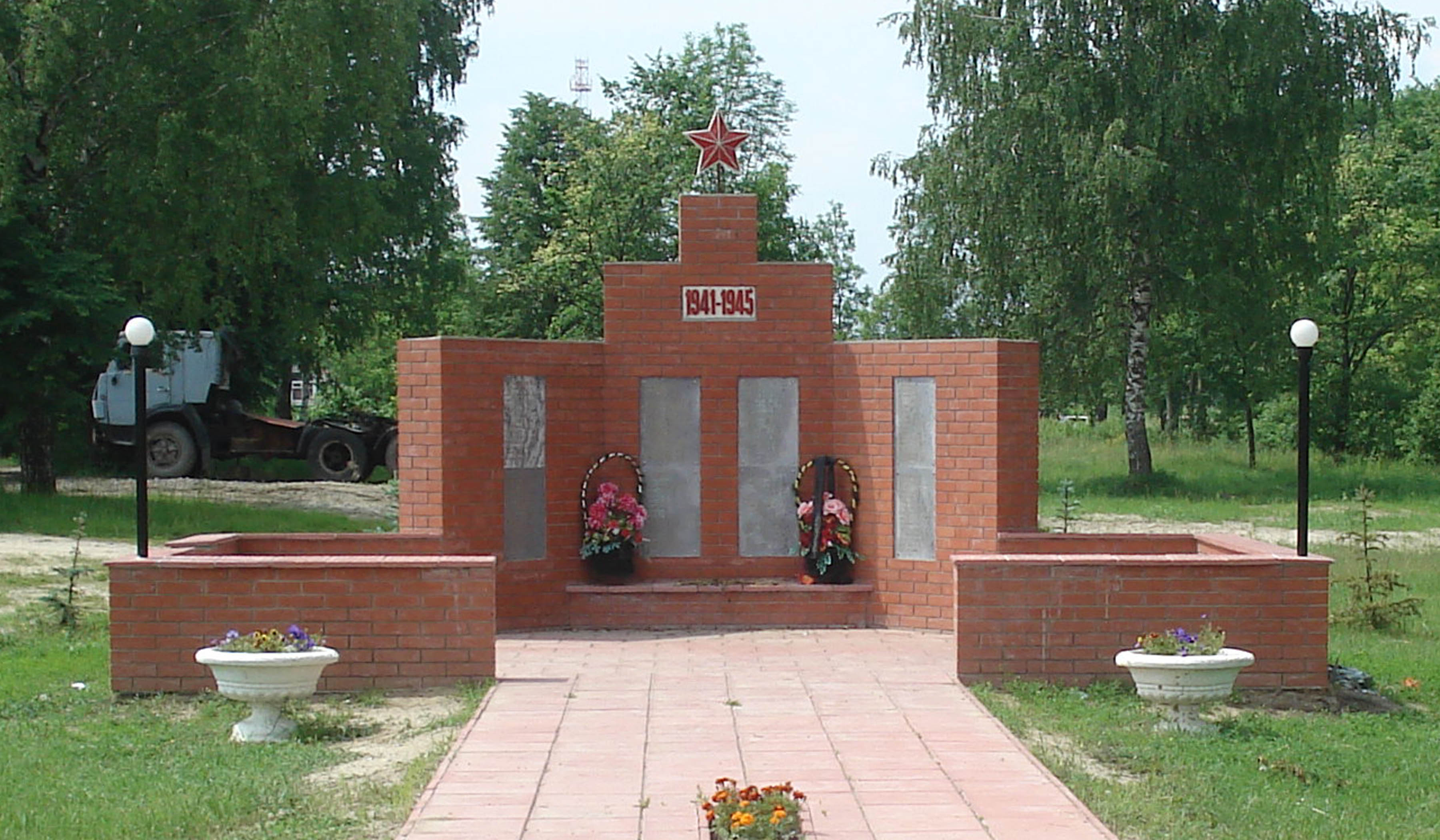
Great Patriotic War Memorial in Antsiferovo

Antsiferovo (Russian: Анци́ферово) is a rural locality (a village) in Orekhovo-Zuyevsky District of Moscow Oblast, Russia, located near the Likhotsa River, 72 kilometers (45 mi) south-east of Moscow. In the past, it was named Ontsyforovo (Онцыфорово) and Antsyferovo (Анцыферово). Postal code: 142641.

Municipally, the village is a part of Davydovsky Rural Settlement (the administrative center of which is the village of Davydovo). Population: 518 (1997). Postal code: 142642.

== History ==
In the 17th century, a female Paraskevi skete operated near Antsiferovo.

The village was first mentioned in the 18th century as a rural estate of Count Ivan Illarionovich Vorontsov. In the first half of the 19th century the village was owned by poruchik Gerasim Stepanovich Myagkov. In 1852, it again changed ownership, this time to Privy Councillor Mikhail Ivanovich Pozen.

The village is located in the historical area of Zakhod (a part of Guslitsa). In the 19th century, it was a part of Zaponorskaya Volost of Bogorodsky Uyezd of Moscow Governorate. The overwhelming majority of the population of Antsiferovo were Old Believers, who from the end of the 19th century were guided by the Russian Orthodox Old-Rite Church.

As in many other Guslitsa's villages, icon painting was a developed craft in Antsiferovo. The craft was started in Guslitsa around 1730 by Antsiferovo peasants F. Yevseyev, who studied iconography in Veliky Novgorod, and A. Afanasyev, who studied in Moscow. In later times, twenty-five icon-painters worked in Antsiferovo.

In 1862, there was already an Old Believers' chapel in the village.

On April 23, 1911, an Old Believers' house of prayer burned down in the village, and the residents petitioned the government to build a new one.

== Population ==
In 1852, the village consisted of 160 homesteads comprising 1,006 inhabitants (464 male and 542 female). By 1862, the population increased slightly to 175 homesteads comprising 1,070 people (520 male and 550 female). By 1925, the population had grown to 211 households comprising 1,137 inhabitants. As of January 1, 1997, the population was 515.
