= February 1963 =

Month of 1963

<<	February 1963					>>
Su	Mo	Tu	We	Th	Fr	Sa
					1	2
3	4	5	6	7	8	9
10	11	12	13	14	15	16
17	18	19	20	21	22	23
24	25	26	27	28

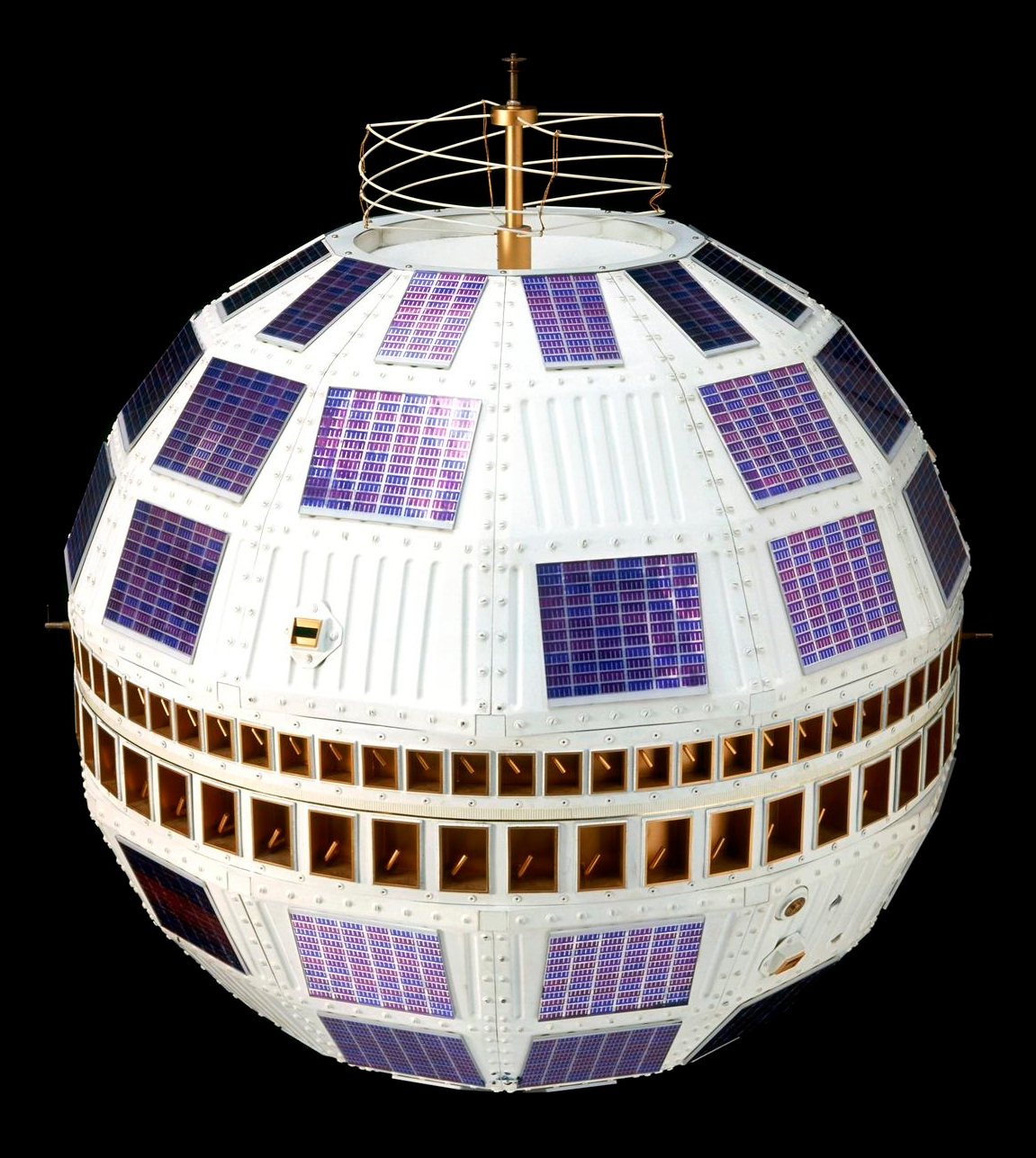
February 21, 1963: Telstar becomes first satellite destroyed by radiation

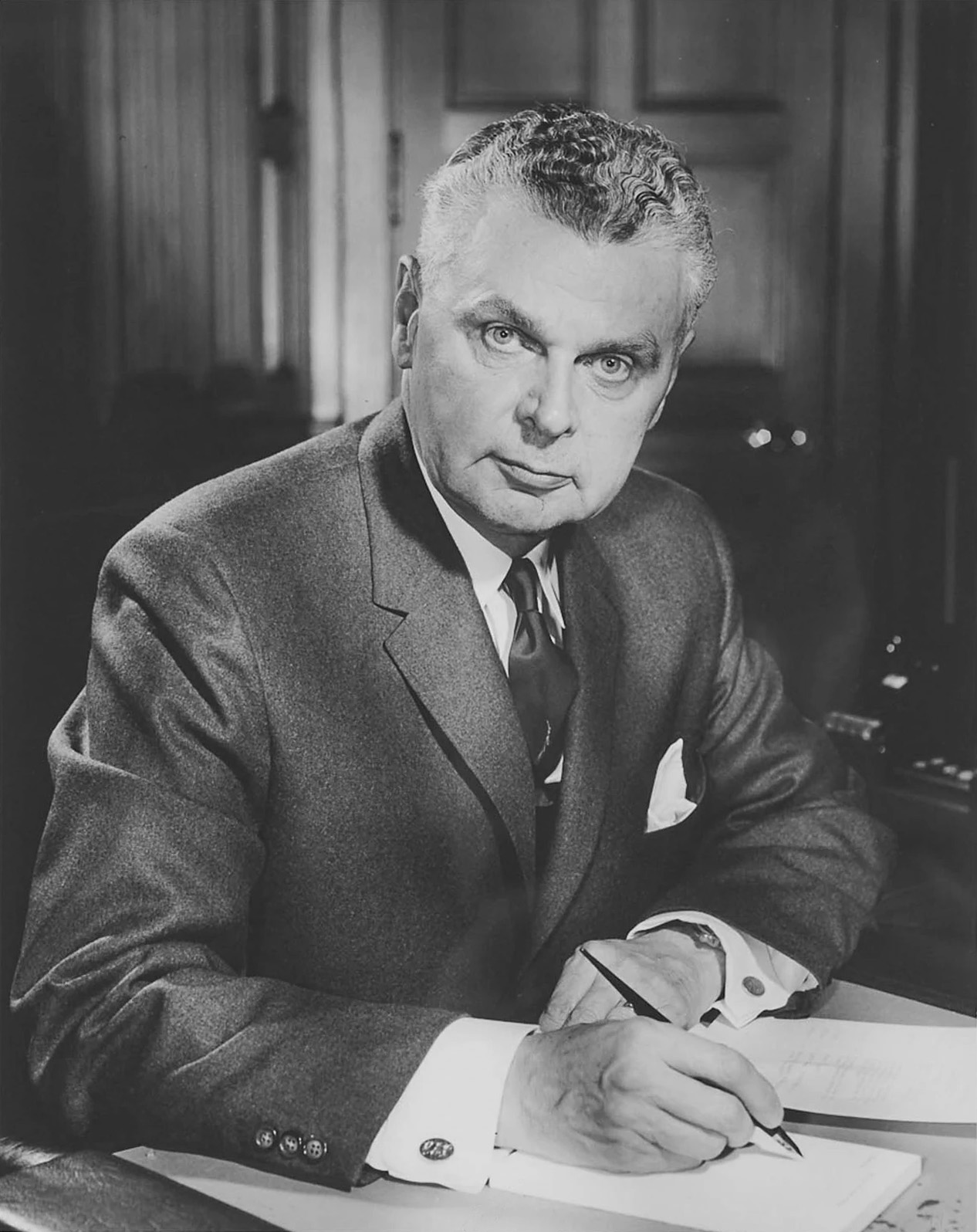
February 5, 1963: Canada's Prime Minister Diefenbaker loses vote of confidence

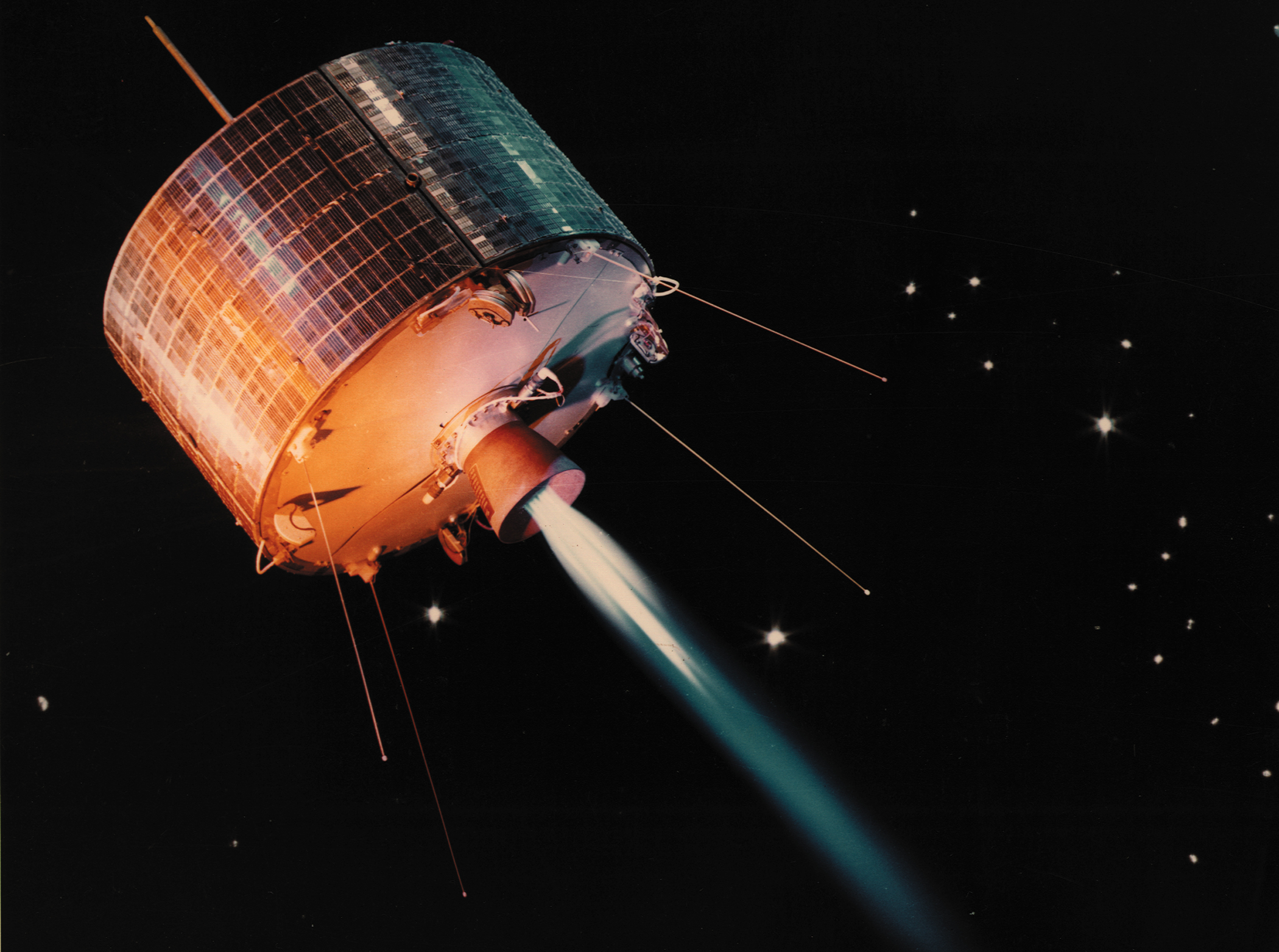
February 14, 1963: Syncom 1 becomes the first geosynchronous satellite, but is damaged beyond repair

The following events occurred in February 1963:

== February 1, 1963 (Friday) ==
- At Ulus Square in Ankara, 87 people were killed and 200 injured when a Vickers 754D Viscount airliner fell into a crowd in the Turkish city. Middle East Airlines Flight 265, with 14 people on board, was descending for a landing at Ankara after departing from Nicosia in Cyprus. At the same time, a Turkish Air Force C-47 airplane with a crew of three was approaching the same airport after a training flight. The two collided at 7,000 feet (2,100 m), and all 17 people on both aircraft were killed. The wreckage of the Vickers Viscount fell into the crowd below, 20 seconds later.
- The collapse of a school chapel killed 104 people, mostly schoolgirls, during prayer services in the town of Biblián, in Ecuador. There were 450 people inside when the roof fell under heavy rains.
- The Mercury Project Office canceled a peroxide expulsion experiment for the April Mercury 9 mission, but kept the planned zodiacal light experiment.

== February 2, 1963 (Saturday) ==
- Pentti Nikula of Finland broke the world record for the pole vault, which had been held by a succession of Americans for almost 35 years. Nikula cleared the bar at 4.94 meters (16 feet, 8 3/4 inches) using a fiberglass pole.
- Kim Jong-pil founded South Korea's Democratic Republican Party. Kim would be forced into exile three weeks later, on February 24.
- General Ivan Serov was dismissed from his job as Director of the GRU and replaced by Pyotr Ivashutin.
- The Beatles went on tour at the bottom of an eight-act bill headed by 16-year-old singer Helen Shapiro.
- Born: Eva Cassidy, American singer (d. 1996); in Washington, D.C.
- Died: Patrick Kerwin, 73, Chief Justice of Canada since 1954

== February 3, 1963 (Sunday) ==
- Elections were held in Nicaragua for the President, the 42-member Chamber of Deputies, and the 16 member Senate. Evidence of massive impending fraud caused the Traditional Conservative Party, led by Fernando Agüero Rocha, to abandon its loyalist stance and to call for a boycott of the 1963 elections. René Schick Gutiérrez of the Nationalist Liberal Party, considered a puppet of Luis Somoza and the Somoza family that had ruled since 1932, officially won 90 percent of the vote over the Conservatives Diego Manuel Chamorro. Somoza's party also won two-thirds of the seats in the Chamber and 75% of the Senate seats.
- On orders from Prime Minister Lee Kuan Yew, Operation Coldstore was carried out in Singapore, with the arrest of more than 150 journalists, labor and student leaders, and members of political parties that opposed Lee's People's Action Party (PAP). The detainees were kept at the Outram Road Prison for three months; with the leaders of the Barisan Sosialis and other parties forced out of campaigning, the PAP would capture 2/3rds of the seats in the parliamentary elections, and maintain control thereafter.
- Canadian Minister of National Defence Douglas Harkness resigned in disagreement over the nuclear policies of Prime Minister Diefenbaker, triggering the collapse of the rest of the ministry.

== February 4, 1963 (Monday) ==
- The SS Marine Sulphur Queen, a tanker with a crew of 39 and a cargo of molten sulphur, was heard from for the last time, two days after its departure from Beaumont, Texas, en route to Norfolk, Virginia. Contact between the ship and its owner, Marine Transport Lines, Inc., was lost and the ship was reported missing two days later. Debris from the tanker washed ashore in Florida, but a search by U.S. Coast Guard and U.S. Navy airplanes did not locate the ship. The story of the disappearance of the tanker would first be described as a casualty of the "Bermuda Triangle" in the Argosy magazine article (by Vincent Gaddis in its February 1964 issue) "The Deadly Bermuda Triangle", although an investigating panel concluded that the ship, structurally unsound and burdened by its heavy cargo, broke in half during a storm.
- The UK Football Association decided to postpone the fifth and sixth rounds of the 1962–63 FA Cup because of delays caused by the severe winter.

== February 5, 1963 (Tuesday) ==
- The Canadian House of Commons voted 142–111 in favor of a resolution of no confidence in the government of Prime Minister John Diefenbaker. Parliament was dissolved the next day by Governor-General George Vanier, and elections were scheduled for April 8.
- The U.S. Department of State outlawed travel to Cuba by U.S. citizens following a directive by President John F. Kennedy. The State Department also banned financial and commercial transactions with the Communist nation in the Caribbean.
- The Manned Spacecraft Center (MSC) postponed the Mercury 9 mission, scheduled for April, because of damaged electrical wiring in the Atlas rocket.
- The Gemini Project Office perfected plans for the first U.S. "walk in space". McDonnell Aircraft Corporation studied requirements for crew maneuverability in a closed cabin, allowing an astronaut to stand in an open hatch without leaving the cabin, and allowing a crew member to venture out of the capsule and into space.
- Died: Barnum Brown, 90, American paleontologist who discovered the first documented Tyrannosaurus rex remains in 1902

== February 6, 1963 (Wednesday) ==
- U.S. Defense Secretary Robert McNamara appeared at a nationally televised press conference from the White House to show proof, with photographs from U-2 spy planes, that all offensive missiles had been removed from Cuba.
- Titan II development flight N-16 was launched from Cape Canaveral.
- The prospective Gemini astronauts concluded their training on orbital mechanics and flight dynamics and familiarization with the Gemini spacecraft and Titan launch vehicle.
- Died:
  - Abd el-Krim, 77, Moroccan nationalist who fought for independence against France and Britain after Morocco had become a French protectorate in 1911
  - Piero Manzoni, 29, Italian artist, died of a heart attack.

== February 7, 1963 (Thursday) ==
- In one of New Zealand's worst road accidents ever, a bus crash killed 15 of the 35 people on board after the vehicle's brakes failed nearing the top of the southern descent of the Brynderwyn Range. The bus, bringing back a group of Māori people from a welcome for Queen Elizabeth's visit to Waitangi, plunged over a 130-foot (40 m) embankment, and evoked memories of a December 24, 1953 train crash that killed 151 people who were on their way to Auckland to welcome the Queen to New Zealand.
- In the first ballot to select the new leader of Britain's opposition Labour Party, Harold Wilson received 115 votes, George Brown 88, and James Callaghan 41. Since no candidate received a majority of MP votes, a second round would be held on February 14 between Wilson and Brown.

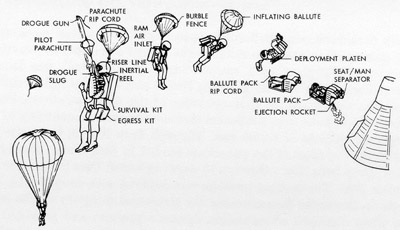
Proposed deployment sequence for Gemini ballute stabilization device

- The first test of the "ballute" system for the Gemini ejection seat was conducted at the U.S. Naval Ordnance Test Station, using two dummies. The ballute (a portmanteau for "balloon" and "parachute") was a device to stabilize the astronaut after ejection at high altitude. In the first test, the ballute failed to inflate or release properly on either dummy. After redesign, five consecutive dummy drops in March succeeded.

== February 8, 1963 (Friday) ==
- A military coup by the Ba'ath Party's Iraqi-wing overthrew the Prime Minister of Iraq, Abd al-Karim Qasim. General Ahmed Hassan al-Bakr became the new Prime Minister and Colonel Abdul Salam Arif became President.
- Britain's Royal Navy conducted the world's first experimental trials of a vertical take-off and landing fixed-wing aircraft aboard an aircraft carrier, testing the Hawker Siddeley P.1127 prototype aboard HMS Ark Royal.
- Northrop Corporation completed the drop tests in developing the parachute recovery system for Project Gemini.

== February 9, 1963 (Saturday) ==
- The Metropolitan Josyf Slipyj, Archbishop and leader of the Ukrainian Greek Catholic Church and a Roman Catholic cardinal, was allowed to leave Ukraine by the Soviet Union, departing Lviv by train. He would never return, dying in 1984.
- The Boeing 727 made its first flight. Pilot S. L. Wallick, copilot R. L. Loesch and flight engineer M. K. Schulenberger took the plane aloft from the company's airfield at Renton, Washington.
- Died: Abd al-Karim Qasim, 48, former Prime Minister of Iraq, was executed by a firing squad, one day after being overthrown and only hours after a brief court-martial.

== February 10, 1963 (Sunday) ==
- U.S. Attorney General Robert F. Kennedy, taking up a challenge made by his brother, the President, for U.S. Marines to meet Theodore Roosevelt's standard for hiking 50 miles (80 km) within three days, completed the distance in 17 hours and 50 minutes.
- Five cities in Japan, on the northernmost part of the island of Kyūshū, were merged to become the city of Kitakyūshū, with a population of more than one million.
- Born:
  - Smiley Culture (stage name for David Victor Emmanuel), British reggae singer and DJ; in South London (committed suicide, 2011)
  - Lenny Dykstra, American baseball player and 1993 Silver Slugger Award winner; in Santa Ana, California

== February 11, 1963 (Monday) ==
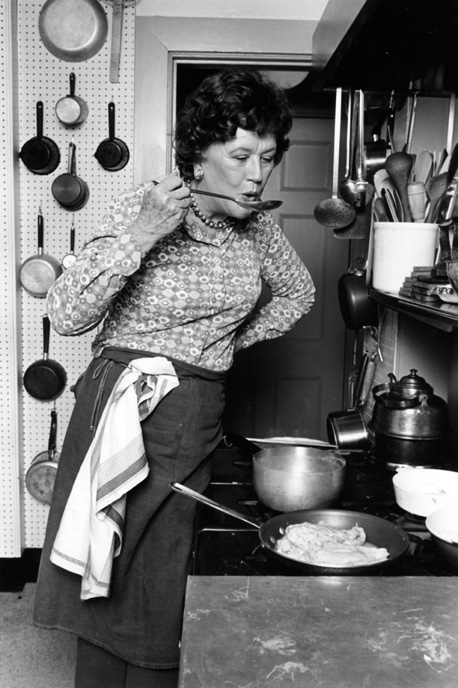
Julia Child

- The French Chef, one of the most well-known American cooking shows on television, premiered on Boston public television station WGBH in Boston and was hosted by Julia Child, co-author of the book Mastering the Art of French Cooking. The show ran for nine seasons and 206 episodes until 1973.
- The Beatles recorded the ten songs of their debut album Please Please Me in a single, 13-hour session at the Abbey Road Studios.
- Died: Sylvia Plath, 30, American poet, novelist and short story writer and author of The Bell Jar, committed suicide at her apartment in London by inhaling carbon monoxide fumes from her gas oven.

== February 12, 1963 (Tuesday) ==
- All 43 people on Northwest Orient Airlines Flight 705 were killed when the Boeing 720 broke up in mid-air during a severe thunderstorm shortly after takeoff from Miami International Airport and crashed into the Florida Everglades. The plane departed from Miami at 1:35 p.m. local time, bound for Chicago, and was cleared to climb to a higher altitude to avoid a thunderstorm. At 1:48 p.m., the plane was broken apart by downdrafts at an altitude of 10,000 feet (3,000 m) and crashed.
- NASA published its objectives for the Mercury 9 mission. The first U.S. mission to stay in space for more than 24 hours would complete almost 22 orbits and splash down in the Pacific Ocean 70 nautical miles (130 km; 81 mi) from Midway Island. Astronaut Gordon Cooper's ability to function in more than one day of weightlessness would be evaluated for longer flights. MSC announced that Mercury 9, originally set for April, would be launched in May.
- Construction work began on the Gateway Arch at St. Louis, Missouri, United States. The 620-foot (190 m) tall structure, commemorating St. Louis as the "gateway to the West", would be completed on October 28, 1965.
- Born:
  - Jacqueline Woodson, American children's author known for Brown Girl Dreaming, winner of four Newbery Awards and a MacArthur Grant; in Columbus, Ohio
  - John Michael Higgins, American actor, comedian and game show host known for America Says and Split Second; in Boston, Massachusetts

== February 13, 1963 (Wednesday) ==
- Residents of the Rwenzori Mountains in the Toro Kingdom region of southwestern Uganda rebelled against the government and declared independence of a state they called the Republic of Ruwenzuru. The Toro independence movement would be defeated in 1970, and a majority of the secessionist leaders would be murdered in 1972.
- A 7.3 magnitude earthquake occurred off the coast of Taiwan, near Su-ao, Yilan County. Despite its magnitude, the earthquake killed only three people. The dead were highway workers near Taichung who were buried in an avalanche triggered by the tremor.

== February 14, 1963 (Thursday) ==
- The Coca-Cola Company introduced its first low calorie soft drink, TaB, a sugar-free cola sweetened with cyclamates rather than sugar, test marketing it in Springfield, Massachusetts. Days later, the Pepsi Cola Company introduced its Patio cola on February 20 in test-marketing in Greenville, South Carolina. Neither drink was the first in the U.S. market. The Royal Crown Cola company, manufacturers of RC Cola, had introduced Diet Rite Cola in 1955.
- Syncom 1 was launched from the United States and became the first satellite to be placed into geosynchronous orbit, but failed to function as a communications satellite because its equipment was damaged in the process of being aligned to coincide with the rotation of the Earth.
- The World Boxing Council (WBC) was established at a meeting in Mexico City by representatives of 11 countries (the United States, the United Kingdom, the USSR, France, Mexico, Panama, Argentina, Chile, Peru, Venezuela, Brazil, Tunisia, and the Philippines. Representatives had been invited by Adolfo López Mateos, then President of Mexico, to form an international organization to unify all commissions of the world to control the expansion of boxing.
- Harold Wilson was elected leader of Britain's opposition Labour Party, defeating George Brown 144–103 in the second ballot, and putting Wilson in line to be the nation's next Prime Minister when general elections took place.
- The Indian Air Force received its first batch of Soviet fighters, Mikoyan-Gurevich MiG-21s.
- Born: John R. Dilworth, American animator, producer and creator of the animated television series Courage the Cowardly Dog; in New York City

== February 15, 1963 (Friday) ==
- Television was introduced in Singapore, with one hour per week of programming initially, increasing by April to five hours of programming each weeknight, and 10 hours each on Saturday and Sunday.
- The Leonard's M&O Subway (later the Tandy Center Subway), the only privately owned subway in the United States, opened in Fort Worth, Texas. It would cease operations in 2002.
- The Dutch liner Maasdam struck the wreckage of SS Harborough at Bremen, West Germany, and was holed. All 230 passengers and 276 crew were rescued by the German ship SS Gotthilf Hagen. The Maasdam had been three days away from inaugurating direct service between West Germany and the United States.
- Agena target vehicle plans were presented to the Gemini Project Office, with tests of the target docking adapter to take place at Merritt Island radar tower.

== February 16, 1963 (Saturday) ==
- The first xenotransplantation of a non-human animal's organ into a human being took place in Minneapolis when surgeons led by Dr. Claude R. Hitchcock and R. Joseph Kiser "tried grafting a baboon kidney" into "a woman in whom previously implanted human kidney (from a corpse) was doing poorly", and the kidney "immediately began functioning normally and cleared her blood of wastes". Her body rejected the kidney five days afterward and she died in March, three weeks later.
- Mauritania and Mali signed the Treaty of Kayes at the Malian capital, Bamako, ending a border dispute between the two nations.
- At Melodifestivalen 1963, Sweden selected its entry for the 1963 Eurovision Song Contest, "En gång i Stockholm", sung by Monica Zetterlund.
- Died: László Lajtha, 70, Hungarian composer, ethnomusicologist and conductor

== February 17, 1963 (Sunday) ==
- Turkey accepted the proposal to remove the remaining Jupiter nuclear missiles based there by the United States, with the last of the weapons taken out by April 24; nuclear defense of Turkey would be replaced by Polaris submarines.
- Toru Terasawa of Japan set a new world record for fastest time in the marathon, winning the Beppu Marathon in 2 hours, 15 minutes and 16 seconds.
- African-American activist W. E. B. Du Bois renounced his American citizenship and became a citizen of Ghana, six months before his death.
- Born:
  - Michael Jordan, American basketball player, five time NBA Most Valuable Player Award for the National Basketball Association (in 1988, 1991, 1992, 1996 and 1998), and later owner of the NBA Charlotte Hornets team; in Brooklyn, New York
  - Larry the Cable Guy (stage name for Daniel Lawrence Whitney), American stand-up comedian, actor, and radio personality; in Pawnee City, Nebraska

== February 18, 1963 (Monday) ==
- Mount Agung, a dormant volcano on the Indonesian island of Bali, became active again for the first time in 120 years. Its lava flow would destroy villages in the vicinity and kill more than 1,000 people.
- Born: Udin (Fuad Muhammad Syafruddin), Indonesian journalist who was murdered in 1996. The date of his birth was considered unlucky in the Javanese calendar as it fell on a kliwon Monday.

== February 19, 1963 (Tuesday) ==
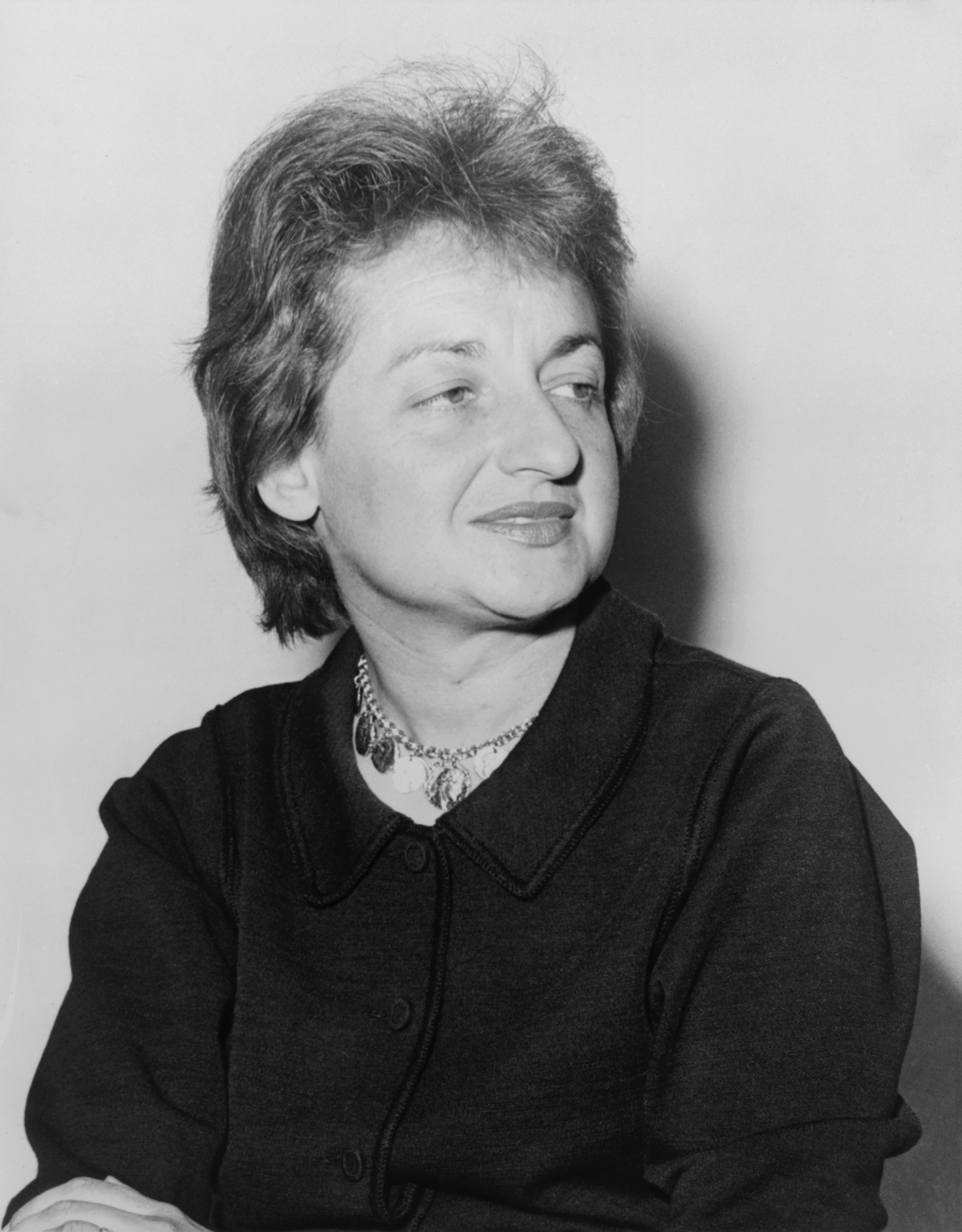
Friedan

- The publication of Betty Friedan's The Feminine Mystique launched the reawakening of the Feminist Movement in the United States, as well as the spread of women's organizations and consciousness-raising groups.
- The results of the 1962 population census of Nigeria were found to be so inaccurate that Prime Minister Abubakar Balewa announced that the count was being scrapped and that a new census would take place later in the year.
- Born: Seal (stage name for Seal Henry Samuel), British pop music singer; in Paddington, London
- Died: Benny Moré, 43, Cuban singer, died from cirrhosis of the liver

== February 20, 1963 (Wednesday) ==
- Der Stellvetreter, by West German playwright Rolf Hochhuth, premiered in West Berlin at the Volksbühne. The play, which would be translated into 17 languages (including in English as The Deputy), was described as a revival of documentary theatre and based on the thesis that Pope Pius XII was a participant in the Holocaust by failing to speak out against it; the hero of the work was Kurt Gerstein, the Nazi SS Officer who attempted to make the Pope aware of the genocide.
- Dr. Hugh L. Dryden, the NASA Deputy Administrator, presented the Friendship 7 spacecraft used by John Glenn a year earlier on the Mercury 6 mission to the Smithsonian Institution. Astronaut John Glenn presented the Smithsonian with his flight suit, boots, gloves, and a small American flag that he carried on the mission.
- Kenneth S. Kleinknecht, manager of the Mercury Project Office, noted that a total of 1,144.51 minutes of orbital space time (19 hours, 4 minutes and 30.6 seconds) had been logged by the first three U.S. orbiting crewed missions (Mercury 6 with John Glenn, Mercury 7 with Scott Carpenter and Mercury 8 with Wally Schirra) in the year that began with Glenn's launch on February 20, 1962. Kleinknecht noted that the flights proved that humans could perform in a space environment, that the design of the Mercury spacecraft was technically sound, and that NASA was confident with the experience accrued for the coming Gemini and Apollo projects.
- Born:
  - Charles Barkley, American NBA player and league MVP in 1993; in Leeds, Alabama
  - James Boasberg, American federal judge, Chief District Judge of the District of Columbia, in San Francisco, California
  - Ian Brown, British alternative rock singer for The Stone Roses; in Warrington
- Died: Ferenc Fricsay, 48, Hungarian-Austrian conductor, died from stomach cancer

== February 21, 1963 (Thursday) ==
- The Communist government of East Berlin yielded to public protests and reversed a decision to assign graduating students to specific occupations and prohibit them from applying for other lines of work. A week earlier, high schools had been sent "lists containing the name of each pupil and the job that the state authorities had picked for him or her" as part of the national requirement of one year of manual labor prior to being able to attend a university. Teachers, students and parents had sent letters of criticism. Neues Deutschland, the official newspaper of East Germany's ruling communist organization, the Socialist Unity Party, announced the rescission of the order and criticized it as "bureaucratic, narrow-minded and schematic".
- Telstar 1, the first privately financed satellite, became the first satellite to be destroyed by radiation. Telstar had been launched from the United States eight months earlier on July 10, 1962, one day after the U.S. had conducted a high altitude nuclear test, and the increased concentration of electrons in the Van Allen radiation belt had caused the communication satellite's transponders to deteriorate.
- A 5.3 magnitude earthquake destroyed the city of Al Maraj, Libya. The quake lasted for 15 seconds, collapsed 70 percent of the town's buildings, killed more than 300 people, and left 12,000 homeless.
- The Central Committee of the Soviet Communist Party sent a formal letter to the Chinese Communist Party's Central Committee, proposing a summit between the two in order to settle their differences. China would respond favorably on March 9.
- Gordon Cooper and Alan Shepard, pilot and backup pilot, respectively, for May's Mercury 9 mission, received a one-day briefing on all experiments approved for the flight, and all hardware and operational procedures to handle the experiments were established.
- Klein's Sporting Goods of Chicago received a shipment of Mannlicher–Carcano rifles from Crescent Firearms Company of New York, including rifle #C2766, which would be used to kill John F. Kennedy.
- Born: William Baldwin, American actor and the third oldest of the four Baldwin brothers; near Massapequa, New York

== February 22, 1963 (Friday) ==
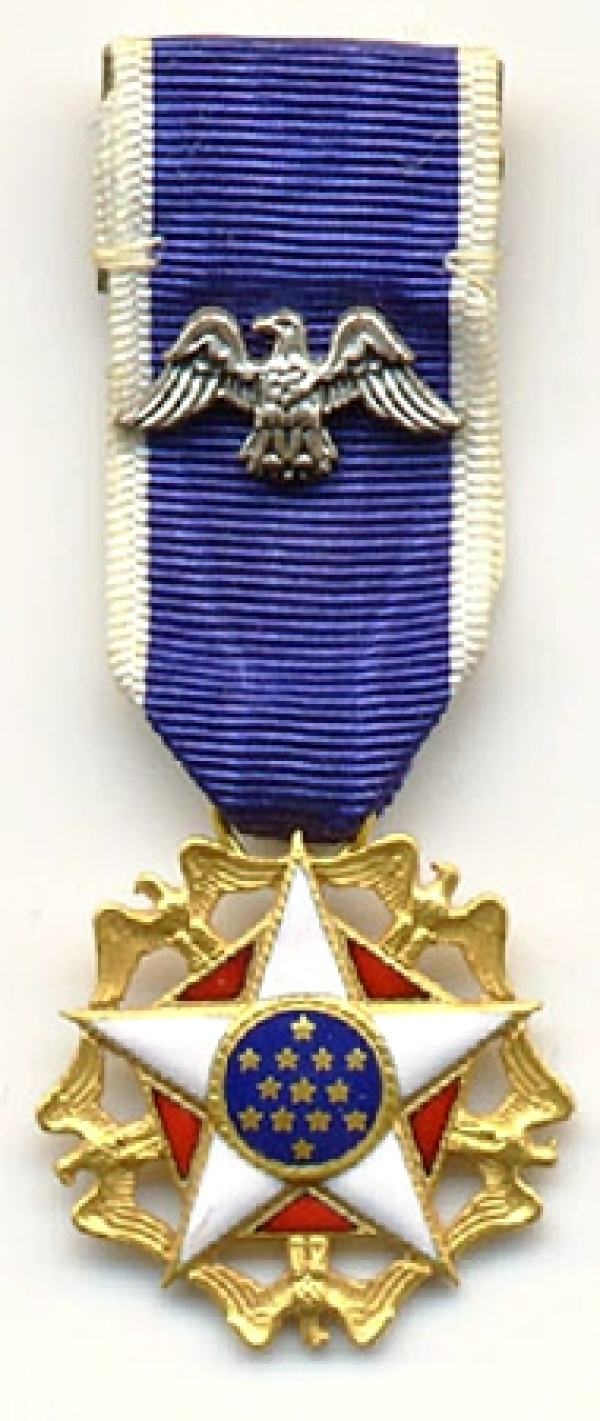
The Medal

- Executive Order 11085 from U.S. President Kennedy established the Presidential Medal of Freedom, for the stated purpose of honoring "any person who has made an especially meritorious contribution" in one of three categories, "the security or national interests of the United States", "world peace", or "cultural or other significant public or private endeavors".
- China and Pakistan signed an agreement to settle the 280-mile (450 km) long border between China's Xinjiang region and Pakistan's Gilgit–Baltistan area, with China relinquishing 775 square miles (2,010 km^{2}) to Pakistan.
- The fictional cartoon character Pebbles Flintstone was "born" in an episode of the cartoon The Flintstones called "The Blessed Event".
- Born: Devon Malcolm, Jamaican-English cricketer; in Kingston

== February 23, 1963 (Saturday) ==
- General Ne Win, the President of Burma, ordered the nationalization of all that country's banks. At 1:00 in the afternoon, tanks were sent to the various financial institutions in Rangoon and the private management was forced by troops to relinquish the vaults to the Army.
- Canadian politician Marcel Chaput called a press conference to announce the opening of the office of the Parti républicain du Québec (PRQ).
- Born: Bobby Bonilla, American baseball player; in The Bronx
- Died: Robert Leroy Cochran, 77, American politician and 24th Governor of Nebraska

== February 24, 1963 (Sunday) ==
- Women were permitted to vote for the first time in the tiny European nation of Monaco as elections were held for the nation's parliament, the 18-member National Council. The National and Democratic Union party, which had been created by a merger of the two parties that had opposed each other in the 1958 election (the conservative Union Nationale des Indépendants and the less conservative Entente Nationale Démocratique), won 17 of the 18 seats. Charles Soccal, a Communist running on the Democratic Union Movement ticket, won the 18th seat in a runoff election.
- Jonny Nilsson won the 10,000m speed skating event, and set a new world record of 15 minutes, 46.6 seconds, to win the World Allround Speed Skating Championships in Japan. Knut Johannesen finished second and Nils Aaness third.
- The fifth running of the Daytona 500 was won by Tiny Lund. The first place purse of $23,350 (equivalent to $178,000 fifty years later and $215,000 in 2013) was the highest in stock car racing at the time.

== February 25, 1963 (Monday) ==
- The sinking of the Japanese ferry Tokiwa Maru killed 47 of the 66 people on board, 10 minutes after the ferry collided with a much larger Japanese cargo ship, Richmond Maru off Kobe. The Tokiwa Maru disaster was one of four fatal ship accidents in a 24-hour period. In the other accidents, The Greek ore carrier SS Aegli capsized in a storm and sank in the Aegean Sea with the loss of 18 of her 22 crew; the four survivors were able to swim to nearby islands. An unidentified Japanese fishing boat and its 11 crew sank in a storm in the East China Sea, and four persons on the Italian oil tanker Miraflores were killed in a fiery collision on the Scheldt River with the British tanker Abadesa.
- "Please Please Me", The Beatles' first single to be sold in the United States, was released by Vee-Jay Records. Only 7,310 copies of the record were bought.
- Born
  - Joseph Edward Duncan, American serial killer; in Tacoma, Washington (died from a terminal brain tumor, 2021)
  - Paul O'Neill, American baseball player; in Columbus, Ohio

== February 26, 1963 (Tuesday) ==
- Armenian-born U.S. inventor Luther Simjian received a patent for his invention of the "Bankograph", a depository machine for receiving and accurately recording (using optical character recognition) deposits of checks, currency and coins and providing a receipt for the customer. U.S. Patent 3,079,603 had been applied for on June 30, 1963. Although the Bankograph, which had been tested by the City Bank of New York while the patent was pending, did not come into widespread use, some of Simjian's optical recognition technology would be incorporated for automated banking.
- Gemini Project Office (GPO) decided that spacecraft separation of the spacecraft from the launch vehicle would be accomplished manually, and that no second-stage cutoff signal to the spacecraft would be required. GPO directed McDonnell to remove pertinent hardware from the spacecraft and Martin to recommend necessary hardware changes to the launch vehicle.

== February 27, 1963 (Wednesday) ==
- Juan Bosch took office as the 41st president of the Dominican Republic. His democratically elected government would exist for less than seven months, and be overthrown by a military coup on September 25, 1963.
- Female suffrage was enacted in Iran, by decree of the Shah.
- Died: Makonnen Endelkachew, 73, Prime Minister of Ethiopia from 1943 to 1957

== February 28, 1963 (Thursday) ==
- Chicago Alderman Benjamin F. Lewis of the 24th Ward, the first African-American to be elected to the Chicago City Council from the ward, was found murdered at his office in the 24th Ward's Democratic Party headquarters, two days after being overwhelmingly re-elected to a second term. Lewis had been handcuffed and then shot four times in the back of his head. The murder was never solved.
- Dorothy Schiff resigned from the New York Newspaper Publisher's Association, saying that the city needed at least one paper operating during the newspaper strike. Her newspaper, the New York Post, would resume publication on March 4.
- American comedian Lenny Bruce was convicted by a jury in a Chicago municipal court on charges of obscenity arising from his profanity-laced performance at the Gate of Horn nightclub on December 5.
- The Gemini Project Office (GPO) reported that spacecraft No. 3 had been reassigned to the Gemini flight program.
- Died: Rajendra Prasad, 78, the first President of India, who served from 1950 to 1962
