= April 1963 =

Month of 1963

<<	April 1963					>>
Su	Mo	Tu	We	Th	Fr	Sa
	1	2	3	4	5	6
7	8	9	10	11	12	13
14	15	16	17	18	19	20
21	22	23	24	25	26	27
28	29	30

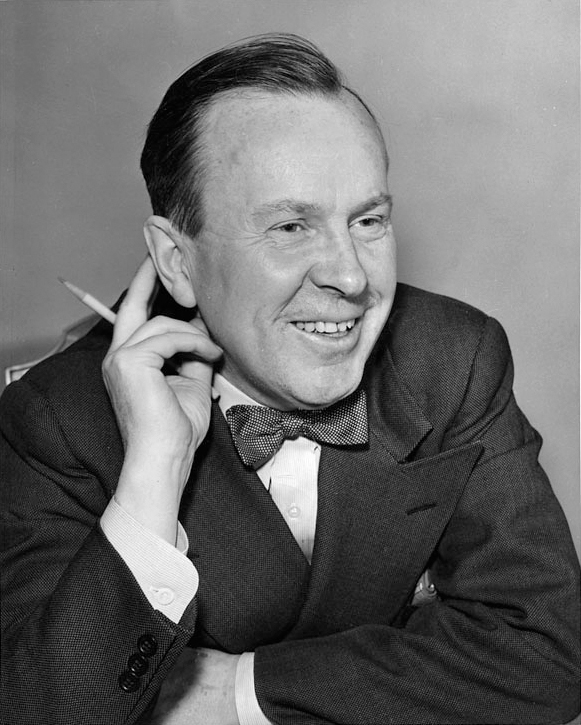
April 22, 1963: Lester Pearson becomes new Prime Minister of Canada

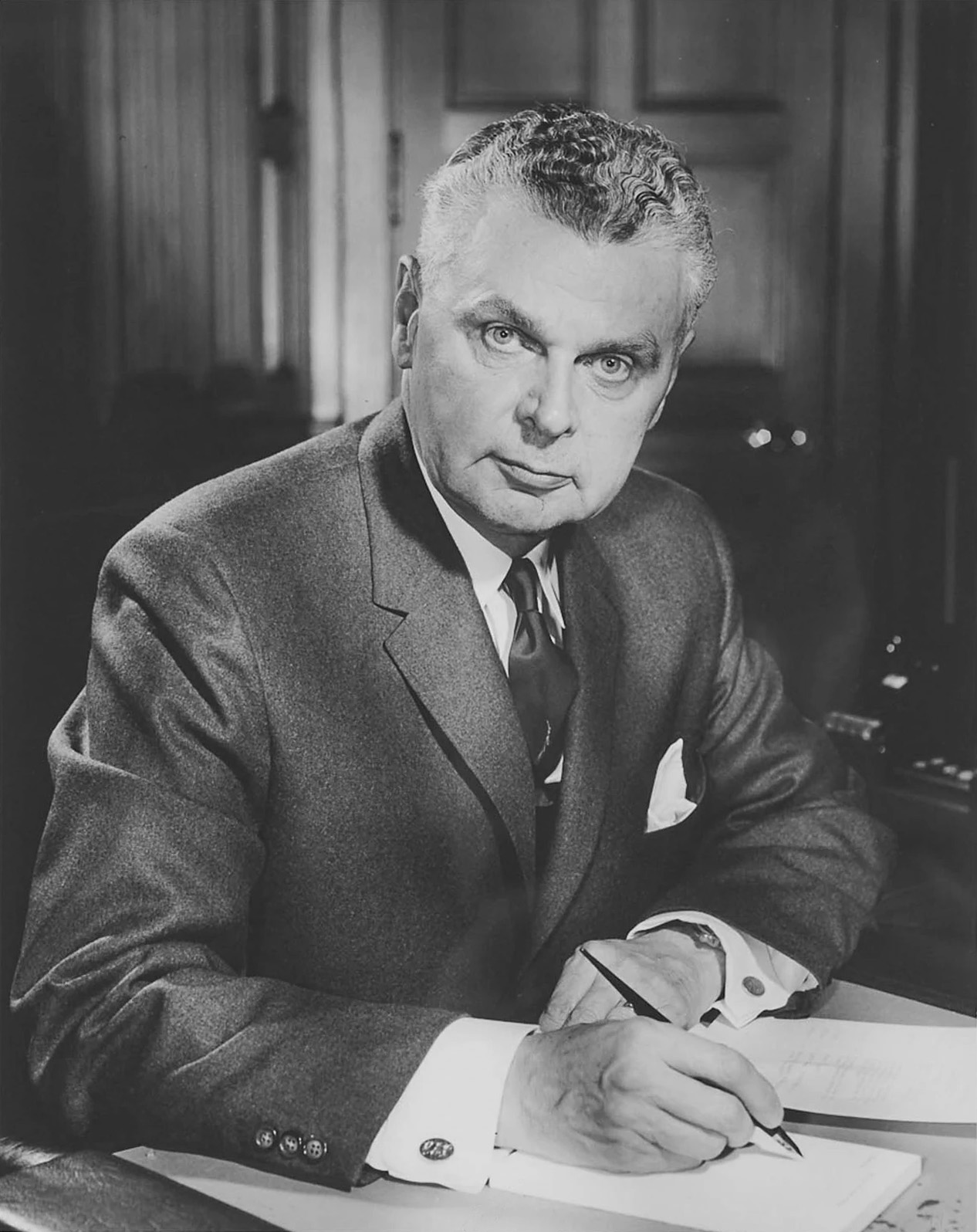
Former P.M. John Diefenbaker out

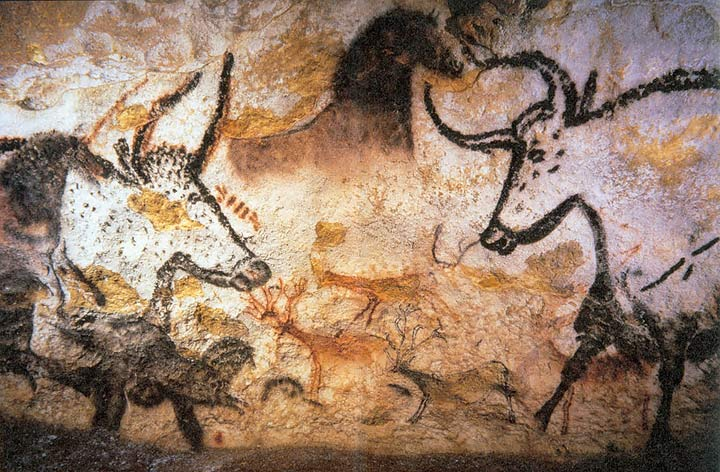
April 20, 1963: Lascaux closed after 17,000 years

The following events occurred in April 1963:

== April 1, 1963 (Monday) ==
- The long-running American TV soap opera General Hospital made its debut on the ABC network. On the same afternoon, the first episode of NBC's hospital soap opera, The Doctors, premiered. General Hospital, set in the fictional town of Port Charles, New York, would begin its 60th year in 2022, while The Doctors, set in the fictional New England town of Madison, would end on December 31, 1982.
- The Titan II-Gemini Coordination Committee was established to direct efforts to reduce longitudinal vibration (pogo oscillation) in the Titan II and to improve engine reliability.
- On Her Majesty's Secret Service, Ian Fleming's eleventh James Bond novel, was first published by Jonathan Cape.
- Died: Quinim Pholsena, 47, the Foreign Minister of Laos, was assassinated by a soldier assigned to guard him. Quinim and his wife had returned home from a reception with the King, when Lance Corporal Chy Kong fired a machine gun at the couple. Minister Quinim was hit by 18 bullets, after which the guard "finished him off with a shot through the head".

== April 2, 1963 (Tuesday) ==
- The Soviet Union launched Luna 4 at 8:04 a.m. UT toward the Moon, using a curving path rather than a straight trajectory.
- NASA signed an almost half-billion-dollar ($456,650,062) contract with McDonnell Aircraft Corporation to produce 13 Gemini spacecraft, the next generation of capsules designed to carry two astronauts rather than the single-person capacity Mercury spacecraft. In addition to the 13 flight-rated Geminis, McDonnell would also provide the docking simulator trainer, five boilerplates, and three static articles for vibration and impact ground tests. On the same day, NASA's Director of Manned Space Flight, D. Brainerd Holmes, to explain a request for a $42.6 million increase in Project Gemini's Fiscal Year 1963 budget.
- The Navy of Argentina began a revolt against the government of President José María Guido, with the insurrection starting at Puerto Belgrano. The rebellion would quietly end the next day.
- Singapore television channel Saluran 5 Television Singapura began the regular service in the Asian nation, with four hours of programming every evening.
- The Beatles began their Spring 1963 UK tour in Sheffield, England.

== April 3, 1963 (Wednesday) ==
- The Delaware Supreme Court upheld their state's law, unique in the United States, permitting the flogging of criminals. Although the penalty, dating from colonial days, had not been carried out for several years, a 20-year-old man had been given a probated sentence of 20 lashes for auto theft, then violated the probation.
- Southern Christian Leadership Conference (SCLC) volunteers kicked off the Birmingham campaign in Birmingham, Alabama, against racial segregation in the United States, with a sit-in.

== April 4, 1963 (Thursday) ==
- The cost of making a long-distance telephone call was lowered throughout the continental United States, with a maximum charge of one dollar for three-minute "station-to-station" calls made between 9:00 p.m. and 4:30 a.m. The equivalent 60 years later for the three-minute call would be $10.50.
- Network Ten, the third television network in Australia, began with the granting of a corporate operating license to United Telecasters Sydney Limited. Broadcasting would begin on ATV-0 in Melbourne on April 1, 1964, and on Channel Ten in Sydney on April 5, 1965.
- All 67 people on board Aeroflot Flight 25 were killed, one hour after the Ilyushin-18 plane had taken off from Moscow's Sheremetyevo Airport, bound for Krasnoyarsk.
- The Beatles performed at Stowe School in Buckinghamshire, UK, for a fee of £100, having accepted a personal request from schoolboy David Moores, a fellow Liverpudlian (and later chairman of Liverpool F.C.).
- The Henry Miller novel Tropic of Cancer went on sale legally in the United Kingdom for the first time, after having been banned for thirty years because it had been deemed obscene.
- Died: Gaetano Catanoso, 84, Italian parish priest canonized by Pope Benedict XVI in 2005

== April 5, 1963 (Friday) ==
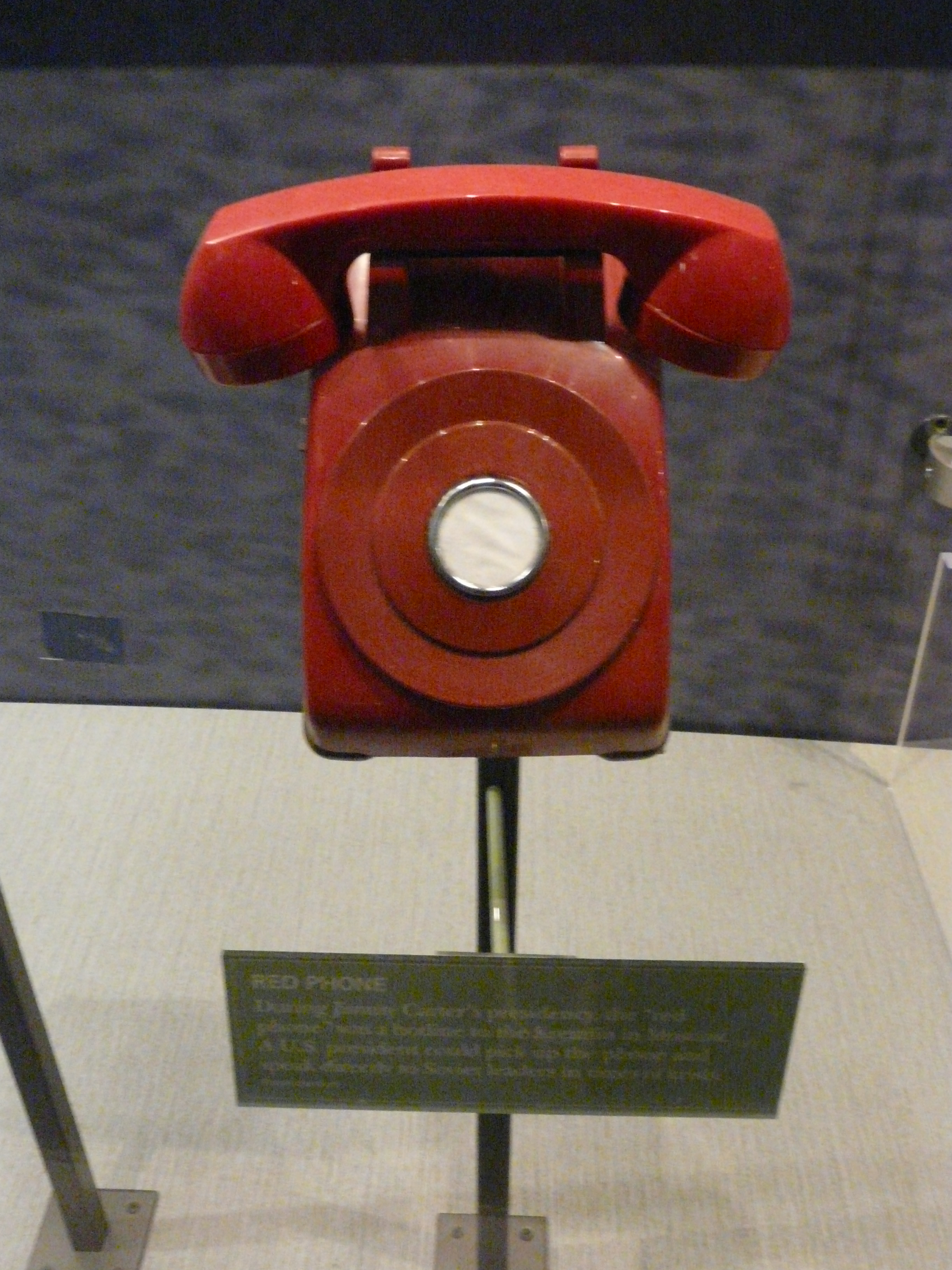
"The Hotline"

- The Soviet Union accepted an American proposal to establish a Moscow–Washington hotline so that the leaders of the two nations could communicate directly with each other in order to avoid war. Originally, the hot line was a teletype system rather than a direct voice line.
- Luna 4, the first successful spacecraft of the USSR's "second generation" Luna program, missed the Moon by 8,336.2 kilometres (5,179.9 mi) at 13:25 UT and entered a barycentric Earth orbit.
- Mercury 9 pilot Gordon Cooper and backup Alan Shepard visited the Morehead Planetarium in North Carolina to review the celestial sphere model, practice star navigation, and observe a simulation of the flashing light beacon experiment planned for the mission.
- Ferdinand Marcos became President of the Senate of the Philippines.
- Died: Sonja McCaskie, 24, British skier and 1960 Olympics competitor, was kidnapped and murdered.

== April 6, 1963 (Saturday) ==
- The South African Soccer League, formed in 1961, was banned from further use of public stadiums because its teams included white, black and mixed race players, in violation of the Group Areas Act, and a game at Alberton, a suburb of Johannesburg, was cancelled on the day of the match. Fans climbed the fence surrounding the locked Natalspruit Indian Sports ground and 15,000 people watched the Moroka Swallows defeat Blackpool United, 6–1. Afterwards, the SASL was permanently denied access to playing fields, and disbanded in 1967 after years of financial losses.
- Boots Randolph, better-known as an accompanist for many performers in rock, pop, and country music, had his only U.S. hit, reaching #35 on the Billboard chart with "Yakety Sax".
- The Kingsmen recorded their influential cover of "Louie Louie" in Portland, Oregon, released in June.
- The Germany national rugby union team played a friendly international against a France XV at Frankfurt, losing 9–15.
- Born:
  - Rafael Correa, President of Ecuador from 2007 to 2017; in Guayaquil
  - Phan Thị Kim Phúc, more commonly referred to as "The Girl in the Picture" or "Napalm Girl", she is best known as the nine-year-old child depicted in the Pulitzer Prize–winning photograph, titled "The Terror of War", taken at Trảng Bàng during the Vietnam War on June 8, 1972; in Trảng Bàng, South Vietnam
- Died:
  - Allen Whipple, 81, pioneering American cancer surgeon
  - Otto Struve, 65, Russian astronomer

== April 7, 1963 (Sunday) ==
- In Kenya, 72 of the 82 people on a bus were killed when the vehicle ran off of the edge of a bridge and plunged into the Tiva River. The bus was bringing churchgoers back from a meeting in Mitaboni. Only the driver and nine other people were able to escape.
- Harold Holt, at that time the Treasurer of Australia, announced that Australia would introduce decimal currency in February 1966. The Australian pound, worth 20 shillings (or 240 pence), would be replaced by the Australian dollar, worth 100 cents, on February 14, 1966.
- Yugoslavia was proclaimed to be a "socialist federative republic", and Josip Broz Tito was named President for Life. Tito would remain President until his death in 1980.
- At Augusta National Golf Club, 23-year-old Jack Nicklaus won the 27th Masters Tournament, becoming the youngest player to win the Masters. Nicklaus finished one stroke ahead of Tony Lema, 286 to 287.
- At more than 700 pages, the first full Sunday edition of The New York Times since the end of the printer's strike set a record for the size of a newspaper. Each copy of the Times edition weighed 7.5 pounds (3.4 kg).

== April 8, 1963 (Monday) ==
- In elections for the 265 seats in Canada's House of Commons, the Liberal Party, led by Lester B. Pearson, won 128 seats, five short of a majority, while Prime Minister John Diefenbaker's Progressive Conservatives lost 21 seats and their control of the House. Pearson would replace Diefenbaker as Prime Minister on April 22.
- In the electoral race to represent the Pontiac–Témiscamingue district of Quebec in Canada's House of Commons, the two candidates, Progressive Conservative Paul Martineau and Liberal Paul-Oliva Goulet both received 6,448 votes. Under the system at the time for breaking a tie, the district's returning officer in charge of counting the votes decided in favor of Martineau.
- At the 35th Academy Awards, Lawrence of Arabia won the Academy Award for Best Picture. Gregory Peck won Best Actor for To Kill a Mockingbird, while Anne Bancroft won Best Actress for portraying Helen Keller's teacher in The Miracle Worker.
- Born: Julian Lennon, British musician, songwriter, actor and photographer; in Liverpool, to John and Cynthia Lennon

== April 9, 1963 (Tuesday) ==
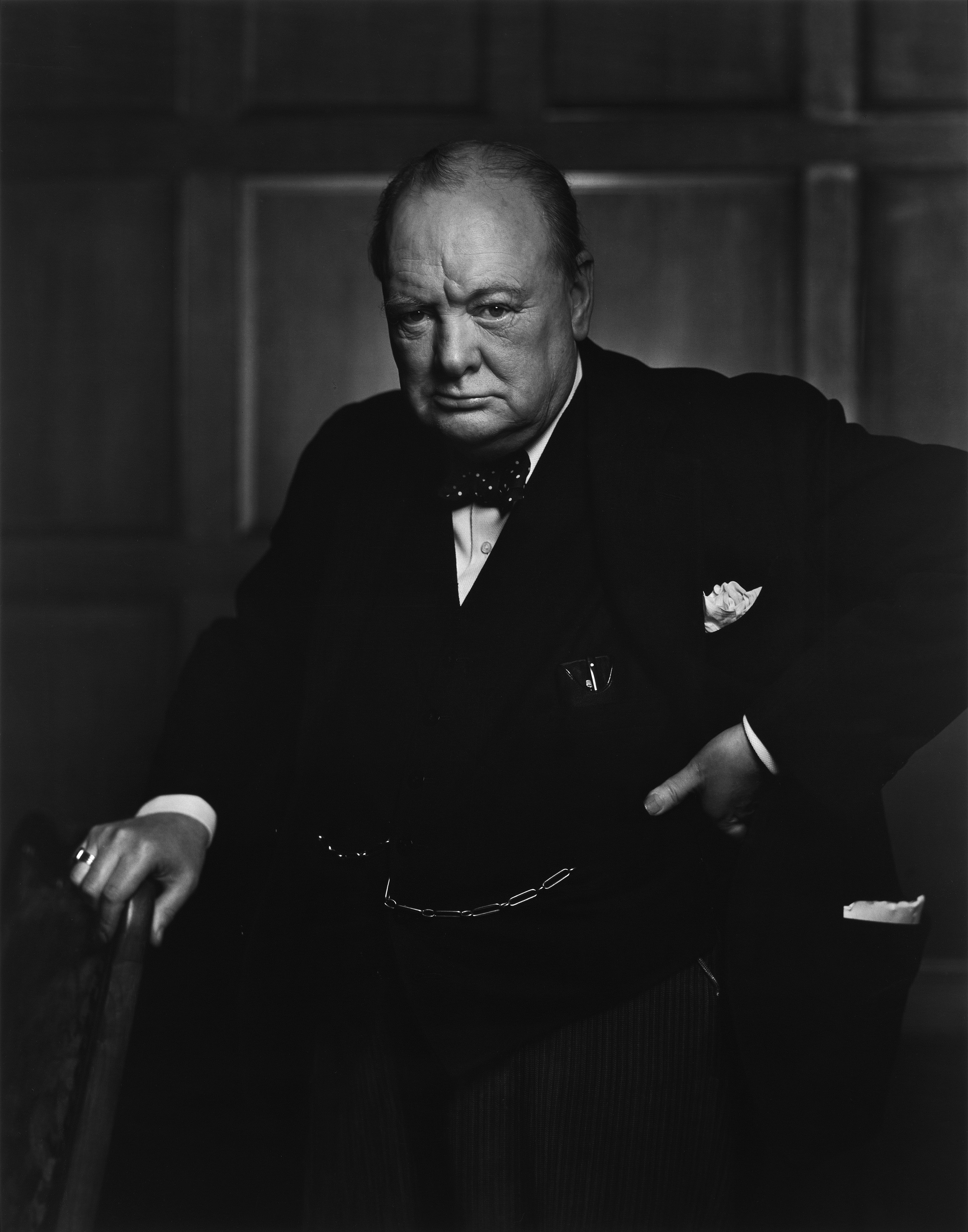
April 9, 1963: Churchill becomes U.S. citizen

- Sir Winston Churchill, the former Prime Minister of the United Kingdom, became the first person to be made an honorary citizen of the United States by act of the U.S. Congress. President Kennedy signed the legislation for the 88-year-old statesman, whose mother Jennie Jerome Churchill, had been a United States native. The House of Representatives had approved the legislation on March 12 by a 377–21 vote, and the U.S. Senate approved on April 2 by voice vote. Churchill was unable to travel from the UK to the U.S., and his son, Randolph Churchill, accepted in his place in ceremonies that were televised.
- Langley Research Center personnel provided assistance to NASA for the Mercury 9 tethered balloon experiment at Cape Canaveral, installing force measuring beams, soldered at four terminals, to which the lead wires were fastened.
- Despite his party's loss in the elections for the House of Commons, Canada's Prime Minister Diefenbaker said that he would not resign until the new Parliament was called into session.

== April 10, 1963 (Wednesday) ==
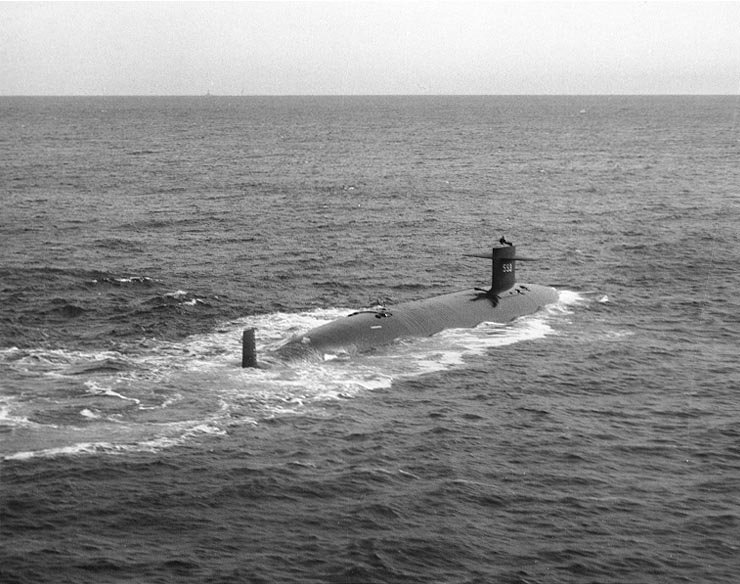
USS Thresher

- All 129 people on the U.S. Navy nuclear submarine Thresher were killed when the vessel sank during sea trials 220 miles (350 km) east of Cape Cod. The dead included 17 civilians in addition to the 112 U.S. Navy personnel on board. The wreckage of Thresher would be located on October 1, 1964.
- An unknown gunman narrowly missed killing former U.S. Army General Edwin A. Walker, who had been working on his taxes at his home in Dallas, Texas. The would-be killer would later be claimed to have been Lee Harvey Oswald, who would allegedly use the same rifle to assassinate U.S. President John F. Kennedy in November.
- The owners and passengers of the yacht Cythera became the first modern victims of piracy (under Australian law) when their boat was stolen by two crew members. The yacht was salvaged over a month later, and the incident would result in various legal complications, including prosecution of the pirates under an act of 1858.
- Frol Kozlov, the 54-year-old Second Secretary of the Soviet Communist Party and Deputy Prime Minister, considered the likely successor to Nikita Khrushchev, had a stroke and was forced to retire. Kozlov would die on January 30, 1965.

== April 11, 1963 (Thursday) ==
- Pope John XXIII issued his final encyclical, Pacem in terris, entitled On Establishing Universal Peace in Truth, Justice, Charity and Liberty, the first papal encyclical addressed to "all men of good will", rather than to Roman Catholics only.
- Mohamed Khemisti, the 33-year-old Minister of Foreign Affairs of Algeria, was mortally wounded by a gunman who shot him outside the National Assembly.
- Buddy Rogers became the first WWF Champion, defeating Antonino Rocca at the finals of the first World Wrestling Federation tournament, held in Rio de Janeiro, Brazil.
- At a meeting at the Langley Research Center in Hampton, Virginia, the Manned Spacecraft Center (MSC) research staff were briefed by the MSC Flight Operations Division officials Christopher C. Kraft, Jr., John D. Hodge, and William L. Davidson about Langley's proposed space station, the Manned Orbital Research Laboratory (MORL). The spokesmen described the Flight Operations Division's philosophy and proposed program phases leading to an operational MORL. Specifically, they cited crew selection and training requirements, the need for a continuous recovery capability, communications requirements, and handling procedures for scientific data.
- The U.S. Chief of Naval Operations went before the press corps at the Pentagon to announce that the nuclear submarine USS Thresher had been lost with all hands.
- Born:
  - June and Jennifer Gibbons, the "Silent Twins", criminals and writers; in Barbados (d. 1993, Jennifer)
  - Saif al-Adel, Egyptian-born al-Qaeda terrorist; in Monufia Governorate, United Arab Republic

== April 12, 1963 (Friday) ==
- Martin Luther King Jr., Ralph Abernathy, Fred Shuttlesworth and others were arrested in a Birmingham, Alabama, protest for "parading without a permit".
- The Soviet nuclear powered submarine K-33 collided with the Finnish merchant vessel M/S Finnclipper in the Danish Straits. Although severely damaged, both vessels made it to port.
- Died:
  - Herbie Nichols, 44, American jazz pianist and composer, died of leukemia.
  - Kazimierz Ajdukiewicz, 72, Polish philosopher and logician

== April 13, 1963 (Saturday) ==
- United States Marine Corps UH-34 Seahorse transport helicopters based at Da Nang, South Vietnam, airlifted 435 South Vietnamese troops to attack a suspected Viet Cong stronghold in mountains along the Thu Bồn River. For the first time, Marine Corps helicopters received an attack helicopter escort, in the form of United States Army UH-1B gunships.
- Divers discovered the wreckage of the Dutch ship Vergulde Draeck almost 307 years after it sank off the coast of Australia. The vessel, carrying 193 people, had gone down on April 28, 1656, with 118 drowning. Three centuries later, a group of skindivers found the wreck 7 miles (11 km) from Ledge Point, Western Australia.
- Pete Rose of the Cincinnati Reds got the first of a record 4,256 hits in a Major League Baseball game, hitting a triple off a pitch by Bob Friend of the Pittsburgh Pirates. The Reds lost, 12–4.
- The USSR launched Kosmos 14 from Kapustin Yar aboard a Kosmos-2I 63S1 carrier rocket.
- The UK's Independent Labour Party held its 71st Annual Conference, at Bradford.
- Born: Garry Kasparov, Russian/Soviet chess grandmaster, and world champion from 1985 to 2000; as Garik Kimovich Weinstein in Baku, Azerbaijan SSR
- Died: Babu Gulabrai, 75, Indian Hindi writer

== April 14, 1963 (Sunday) ==
- The Institute of Mental Health (Belgrade) was established.
- Born: Cynthia Cooper, American women's basketball player, MVP of the WNBA for 1996–97 and 1997–98 for the Houston Comets; in Chicago

== April 15, 1963 (Monday) ==
- A White House press release announced that First Lady Jackie Kennedy was pregnant and that her baby would be delivered by Caesarean section in September. Mrs. Kennedy, who had a history of miscarriages, had delayed announcement of her pregnancy. She had been delivered of stillborn children in 1955 and 1956, and had two living children, Caroline (b. 1957) and John Jr. (b. 1960). The child, Patrick Bouvier Kennedy, would be born prematurely on August 7, and would survive for only two days.
- The Manned Spacecraft Center published a detailed flight plan for May's Mercury 9 mission. Due to the extended duration of the flight, an 8-hour sleep period was scheduled with a 2-hour option for when the astronaut would begin his rest period. In addition to the general guidelines, the astronaut had a minute-to-minute schedule of tasks to accomplish.
- An unidentified 58-year-old man, with lung cancer, was admitted to the University of Mississippi hospital. On June 11, 1963, he would become the first person to receive a lung transplant.
- A group of 70,000 marchers arrived in London from Aldermaston, to demonstrate against nuclear weapons. The breakaway group Spies for Peace set up a picket at RSG-6.
- British driver Innes Ireland won the 1963 Glover Trophy motor race, held at Goodwood Circuit, while British driver Jim Clark won the 1963 Pau Grand Prix motor race, held at Pau Circuit.
- Died: "Colossus", the largest snake ever kept in captivity, at the Highland Park Zoo in Pittsburgh. A reticulated Python, she measured 28 1/2 feet long (8.68 meters) and at one time weighed 320 pounds (145 kg).

== April 16, 1963 (Tuesday) ==
- Martin Luther King Jr. issued his "Letter from Birmingham Jail".
- Born:
  - Jimmy Osmond, American singer, actor, and businessman; youngest member of the sibling musical group the Osmonds; in Canoga Park, California
  - Saleem Malik, Pakistani cricketer and national team captain; in Lahore

== April 17, 1963 (Wednesday) ==
- Representatives of Egypt, Syria and Iraq signed a declaration in Cairo to merge their three nations into a new United Arab Republic. Egypt and Syria had been merged as the United Arab Republic from 1958 to 1961 before Syria withdrew, and Egypt and retained the UAR name. Demonstrations followed in Jordan, where citizens of the Kingdom wanted to join the federation, which was never ratified.
- NFL players Paul Hornung of the Green Bay Packers and Alex Karras of the Detroit Lions were ordered suspended indefinitely by Commissioner Pete Rozelle for betting on NFL games. Five other Lions players (John Gordy, Gary Lowe, Joe Schmidt, Wayne Walker and Sam Williams) were fined $2,000 each for betting on the Packers to win the 1962 NFL Championship Game. Hornung and Karras would be reinstated by Rozelle eleven months later after being barred from playing during the 1963 NFL season.
- Grigori Nelyubov, Ivan Anikeyev and Valentin Filatyev were all dismissed from the USSR's cosmonaut corps, after their March 27 arrest for drunk and disorderly conduct.

== April 18, 1963 (Thursday) ==
- The Toronto Maple Leafs beat the Detroit Red Wings, 3–1 in Toronto, to win the NHL Stanley Cup, four games to one.
- Born: Conan O'Brien, American television host, comedian, writer, and producer; in Brookline, Massachusetts
- Died:
  - Yetta Grotofent, 42, tightrope walker who had been part of The Flying Wallendas high wire act under the stage name "Miss Rietta". The sister-in-law of Karl Wallenda fell 65 feet (20 m) to her death while performing at the Shrine Circus in the Civic Auditorium in Omaha, Nebraska. Two other members of the circus troupe had been killed after falling from the high wire in Detroit on January 30, 1962.
  - Cläre Mjøen, 88, German and Norwegian translator and women's rights activist
  - Hemendra Kumar Roy, 74, Bengali children's writer

== April 19, 1963 (Friday) ==
- Under pressure from the United States, South Korea's President Park Chung Hee returned to his pledge to return to civilian rule, and announced that multiparty elections for the presidency and the National Assembly would take place before the end of the year. Park had promised a return to democracy in 1963 when he had taken power in a coup on August 12, 1961, but on March 16, 1963, proposed to extend military rule for another four years. The voting (in which Park would be elected president) would be held on October 15.
- A new dam was inaugurated on the Chubut River 120 kilometres (75 mi) west of Trelew, Argentina, removing the risk of flooding in the Lower Chubut Valley.

== April 20, 1963 (Saturday) ==
- The caves at Lascaux were closed to the general public after fifteen years, in order to protect cave paintings dating from more than 17,000 years ago. The paintings had been rediscovered on September 12, 1940, in the caverns in southwestern France. After the complex was opened to the public in 1948, the works began to erode from carbonic acid produced by the exhalations of the visitors. The Department of Dordogne would create a replica of the paintings in another cave hall, opened as "Lascaux II" in 1983.
- In Montreal, the terrorist campaign of the Front de libération du Québec claimed its first fatality. William Vincent O'Neill, a 65-year-old night watchman and janitor, died in the explosion of a bomb at a Canadian Army recruitment center. O'Neill, who was planning to retire at the end of May, had been scheduled to start his shift at midnight, but had arrived at 11:30 to allow a co-worker to go home, and was killed when the bomb exploded at 11:45 p.m.
- Italy created its first space agency, the Istituto Nazionale per le Richerche Spaziali (IRS) (National Institute for Space Research).
- The 1963 Pan American Games opened in São Paulo, Brazil.
- The final water condensate tank was installed in Mercury spacecraft 20 for the Mercury 9 mission. The system had a 4-pound (1.8 kg), built-in tank, a 3.6-pound (1.6 kg) auxiliary tank located under the couch head, and six 1-pound (0.45 kg) auxiliary plastic containers. The total capacity for condensate water storage was 13.6 pounds (6.2 kg). In operation, the astronaut hand-pumped the fluid to the 3.6-pound tank to avoid spilling moisture inside the cabin during weightlessness.
- Died: Julián Grimau, 41, Spanish Communist leader, was executed by a firing squad despite pleas to Spanish dictator Francisco Franco for clemency.

== April 21, 1963 (Sunday) ==
- Hussein ibn Nasser replaced Samir al-Rifai as Prime Minister of Jordan.
- The first elections for the Supreme Institution of the Baháʼí Faith (known as the Universal House of Justice, whose seat is at the Baháʼí World Centre on Mount Carmel in Haifa, Israel) were held, with voting open until April 23.
- A. J. Foyt won the USAC Championship Car event at Trenton Speedway (New Jersey).
- Jim Clark won the 1963 Imola Grand Prix (in Italy).

== April 22, 1963 (Monday) ==
- Lester Bowles Pearson was sworn into office as the 14th Prime Minister of Canada, soon after John Diefenbaker resigned. The oath was administered by Governor-General Georges Vanier in Ottawa at Vanier's office, where Pearson presented the names of his 25-member cabinet.
- Robert Taschereau took office as the 11th Chief Justice of Canada, replacing Patrick Kerwin, who had died on February 2.
- Cuba released its last American prisoners, 27 men who had been incarcerated by the Castro government. Twenty-one were flown from Havana to Miami after New York lawyer James Donovan had negotiated their freedom. Another six elected to go to other nations rather than returning to the U.S.
- U.S. President Kennedy started the one-year countdown for the opening of the 1964 New York World's Fair by keying "1964" on a touch-tone telephone in the Oval Office, starting "a contraption which will count off the seconds until the opening". Kennedy then spoke over the line to a crowd of about 1,000 people at Flushing Meadow Park, and said "Three hundred sixty-six days from today, I plan to attend your opening". President Kennedy would be killed, however, exactly five months before the Fair's opening on April 22, 1964.
- Mercury spacecraft No. 20 was moved from Hangar S at Cape Canaveral to Complex 14 and mated to Atlas launch vehicle 130-D in preparation for the Mercury 9 mission. The first simulated flight test was begun immediately. Afterward, a prelaunch electrical mate and abort test and a joint flight compatibility test were made.
- Bendix Corporation completed the production of an air lock for the Mercury spacecraft. This component was made to collect micrometeorites during orbital flight. The air lock could accommodate a variety of experiments, such as ejecting objects into trajectories for atmospheric reentry, and exposing objects to a space environment for observation and retrieval for later study. Because of the modular construction, the air lock could be adapted to the Gemini and Apollo spacecraft.

== April 23, 1963 (Tuesday) ==
- Ludwig Erhard was chosen as the successor for retiring West German Chancellor Konrad Adenauer, despite Adenauer's recommendations that the Christian Democratic Party and the Christian Socialist Union Bundestag members choose another person. Erhard, who had been the nation's Economic Minister since 1950, was approved by a vote of 159 to 47.
- The Ukrainian football club FC Karpaty Lviv played its first official match, defeating Lokomotiv Gomel 1–0.
- Died: Yitzhak Ben-Zvi, 78, second and longest-serving President of Israel since 1952. Speaker Kadish Luz became acting president until Zalman Shazar was selected by the Knesset.

== April 24, 1963 (Wednesday) ==
- The Boston Celtics defeated the Los Angeles Lakers, 112–109, to win their fifth consecutive NBA championship, four games to two.
- Princess Alexandra of Kent, first cousin of Queen Elizabeth II, married The Hon. Angus Ogilvy at Westminster Abbey, London.
- The Vienna Convention on Consular Relations was signed, and would enter into force on March 19, 1967.
- Died: Leonid Lukov, 53, Soviet film director and screenwriter

== April 25, 1963 (Thursday) ==
- The United States removed the last of its Jupiter missiles from Turkey, completing an agreement that had been reached with the Soviet Union after the Cuban Missile Crisis of 1962.
- The 12th Syracuse Grand Prix took place in Sicily and was won by Jo Siffert.

== April 26, 1963 (Friday) ==
- Israel signed an agreement with Dassault Aviation to acquire MD-620 short-range missiles, to which Israel would give the name Jericho-1.
- The third and final launch of the U.S.'s expendable launch system Scout X-2M ended in a failure, without reaching orbit.
- Basil Brooke, 1st Viscount Brookeborough, became Lord Lieutenant of Fermanagh.
- Born: Jet Li (stage name for Li Lianjie), Chinese film actor, film producer, martial artist and wushu champion; in Beijing

== April 27, 1963 (Saturday) ==
- Bob Hayes became the first person to run the 100-meter dash in less than ten seconds, in 9.9 seconds at a meet in Los Angeles. However, the accomplishment could not be recognized as a world record because the wind was faster than 5 meters per second (18 km/h or 11.2 mph); the barrier would be broken on October 14, 1968, by Jim Hines at 9.95 seconds.
- The U.S. Marine Corps lost its first aircraft to enemy action in Vietnam, when Viet Cong ground fire shot down a UH-34D transport helicopter near Do Xa, South Vietnam.
- Born: Russell T Davies, Welsh television producer and screenwriter; in Swansea

== April 28, 1963 (Sunday) ==
- Voting was held in Italy for all 630 seats in the Chamber of Deputies and 315 of the 321 seats in the Senate of the Republic. Although the Christian Democratic Party of Aldo Moro retained control with 260 (38.3%) of the Deputies' and 129 (36.6%) of the Senate seats, the Italian Communist Party of Palmiro Togliatti almost doubled its presence in the lower chamber, from 85 to 166 seats, for the second largest number.
- The 17th Tony Awards ceremony took place in New York City.

== April 29, 1963 (Monday) ==
- NASA Headquarters rescheduled the Gemini flight program due to late delivery of the spacecraft. While Gemini 1 was still set for a December launch without a crew, the craft would be put in orbit to flight-qualify the Titan II GLV subsystems and demonstrate the compatibility of the launch vehicle and spacecraft. Gemini 2, originally set to carry the first Gemini astronauts, was set for July 1964 as an uncrewed suborbital flight to test spacecraft reentry under maximum heating-rate reentry conditions. Gemini 3, formerly an orbital rendezvous mission, was set for October 1964 would be the first U.S. flight with a pair of astronauts. Gemini 4 (set for January 1965) would be a 7-day mission using a rendezvous pod. Gemini 6 (July 1965) was to be a 14-day mission to rendezvous with the Agena D target vehicle. Water landing by parachute was planned for the first six flights and land, while landing by paraglider was planned for Gemini 7 onward.
- Five Latin American nations— Mexico, Brazil, Bolivia, Chile and Ecuador— announced their agreement to a proposal by Mexican President Adolfo López Mateos to prohibit the placement of nuclear weapons in their territory.
- Andrew Loog Oldham, 19, signed a contract with The Rolling Stones, becoming their manager. Oldham had seen the band in concert the previous day at the Crawdaddy Club in London.

== April 30, 1963 (Tuesday) ==
- New Hampshire became the first of the United States to legalize a state lottery in the 20th century. The first drawing in the New Hampshire Sweepstakes would take place on March 12, 1964.
- After U.S. Secretary of Defense Robert McNamara implied that the U.S. Air Force would take over Project Gemini, NASA Associate Administrator Robert C. Seamans, Jr. stressed that although the U.S. Department of Defense had a vital role in Gemini management and operations, NASA had the final and overall responsibility for program success.

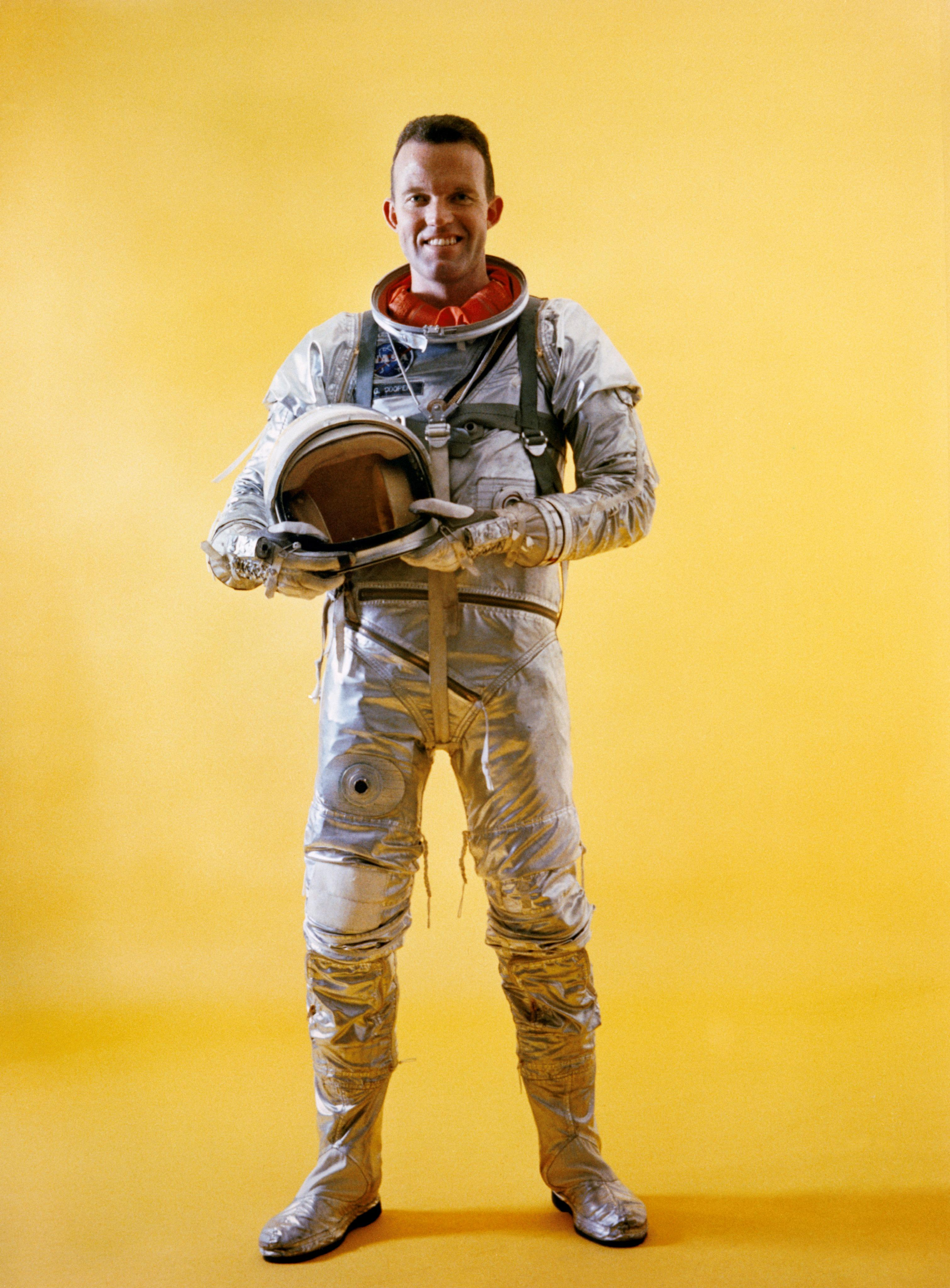
Gordon Cooper wearing the improved Mercury spacesuit

- NASA its improvements to the Mercury pressure suit to be worn in the upcoming Mercury 9 flight. These included a mechanical seal for the helmet, new gloves with an improved inner-liner and link netting between the inner and outer fabrics at the wrist, and increased mobility torso section. The boots were integrated with the suit to be more comfortable for the longer mission, to reduce weight, and to be easier to put on and to remove.
- Born: Michael Waltrip, American race car driver, winner of Daytona 500 in 2001 and 2003; in Owensboro, Kentucky
