= History of the foreign relations of Mauritania =

During the late colonial period, Mauritania had few contacts with the other territories of French West Africa (Afrique Occidentale Française—AOF). At the time of the independence referendum in 1958, Mauritania's representatives on the Grand Council of the AOF remained neutral, while all other AOF members divided between the African Democratic Rally (Rassemblement Démocratique Africain—RDA) and the African Regroupment Party (Parti du Regroupement Africain—PRA). Until Mauritania became independent and Morocco threatened its security, Mauritania did not participate in AOF intraterritorial political, labor, or cultural movements. Only when Mauritania's existence as a state became problematic did it seek international recognition and support.

Throughout the 1960s, Mauritania's main foreign policy objective was preserving its independence in the face of Moroccan irredentism. (Morocco finally recognized Mauritanian independence in 1969.) To that end, the Daddah government insisted on maintaining close ties with France, an effort that included allowing France to station troops on Mauritanian soil. In Africa, Mauritania established ties with the more conservative francophone countries because all the Arab League states (except Tunisia) and the African members of the Casablanca Group (Ghana, Guinea, and Mali) supported Morocco's irredentist claims.

Mauritania applied for admission to the UN in 1960, sponsored by France, but its membership was vetoed by the Soviet Union, which supported the Arab League. For the most part, black Africa and the West favored Mauritania's admission, and the Soviet Union dropped its opposition in 1961 in exchange for a favorable vote on Mongolia's admission. In a final effort to block Mauritania's admission, the Kingdom of Morocco brought the issue to the General Assembly, which supported Mauritania's application by a vote of sixty-eight to thirteen, with twenty abstentions. Mauritania was admitted to the UN on October 27, 1961. Mali, Guinea, and most Arab states supported Morocco in the debate.

In January 1962 Mauritania edged away from its previously conservative, pro-French position by extending recognition to the Provisional Government of the Algerian Republic and refusing to attend meetings of the French-backed Common Saharan States Organization. These tentative displays of independence increased Mauritania's credibility with its more progressive African neighbors and emphasized the country's role as a bridge between Arab North Africa and black Sub-Saharan Africa. Mauritania and Mali subsequently achieved a rapprochement with the signing of the Treaty of Kayes in February 1963. Relations with Algeria improved when Mauritania supported Algeria in its dispute with Morocco. Egypt, known at the time as the United Arab Republic (UAR) and the acknowledged leader of the Arab world, also sided with Algeria, and on October 21, 1964, the UAR officially extended recognition to Mauritania. That action encouraged Daddah to undertake an even bolder foreign policy.

In 1963 Mauritania joined the OAU, whereupon Morocco resigned in protest. In 1964 Daddah became the first President of the recently formed Afro-Malagasy Union for Economic Cooperation (Union Africaine et Malagache de Coopération Economique—UAMCE), a loose grouping of francophone African countries pledging technical and cultural cooperation. When the organization was subsequently upgraded to become a political organization in defiance of the OAU charter, Mauritania withdrew from all but the technical committees.

Throughout the early 1970s, Mauritania continued to play the role of bridge between the Maghreb and sub-Saharan Africa. Mauritania also maintained its commitment to nonalignment while opening relations with Eastern Europe and the radical states of Africa. In support of Arab League and OAU positions, Mauritania did not seek ties with Israel, South Africa, or Portugal.

Mauritania finally established diplomatic relations with Morocco in 1969. Close relations with France, on whom Mauritania continued to rely for much of its development aid, remained the cornerstone of Mauritanian foreign policy through the late 1980s.

Spain's withdrawal from the Spanish Sahara and the latter's partition and annexation by Mauritania and Morocco in 1976 inaugurated an eight-year period of conflict and fighting against Polisario Front guerrillas of the SADR, resulting in military setbacks and stagnating diplomacy for Mauritania. Upon annexation, Mauritania's former ally Algeria severed its ties with the Daddah government in support of the SADR. From 1976 to 1979, Polisario guerrillas increased pressure on Mauritania and launched commando attacks against Fdérik, Zouerat, Bir Moghrein and Nouakchott. As a consequence of the economic and political costs of the fighting, the military successors to Daddah attempted to disengage Mauritania from the conflict; nevertheless, Polisario forces penetrated Mauritania's defenses, often with impunity, to infiltrate fighters into the Western Sahara.

On August 10, 1979, Mauritania signs the Alger Accord with the Polisario, recognizing the right of self-determination of the Sahrawis and abandoning any claim on Western Sahara. Subsequently, relations with Morocco again deteriorated and then finally ruptured in 1981 when Mauritania accused Morocco of backing a coup attempt in Nouakchott. Conversely, relations with the Polisario and Algeria improved. In December 1983, Algeria, Tunisia, and Mauritania signed the Treaty of Peace and Friendship. The following year, Haidalla extended diplomatic recognition and support to the SADR, an action that ultimately led to the downfall of his government. President Taya maintained ties with the SADR, but the link was at best correct and represented little more than Taya's attempt to appease his more formidable neighbors.

Mauritania's principal foreign policy objective in the mid-1980s has been to ensure its own territorial integrity. Translated into diplomacy, this has meant pursuing a policy of strict neutrality in the Western Sahara dispute, improving relations with Morocco and Algeria, and seeking guarantees of support from France should ties with Mauritania's northern neighbors seriously deteriorate. Taya's efforts in that area have had mixed results. Although Taya insisted that Mauritania would remain neutral in the conflict over the Western Sahara, Mauritania faced a mounting threat of greater involvement because the combatants themselves continued to encroach on Mauritanian territory. As the Moroccans pushed southward in the Western Sahara behind their highly effective network of sand walls (berms) to within a few kilometers of the Mauritanian border, Mauritanian armed forces were placed in the position of confronting either well-equipped Moroccan troops pursuing Polisario guerrillas, or Polisario commando teams crossing into and perhaps attacking the berms from Mauritanian territory. In either case, Mauritania would probably be the loser.

Taya has also sought to improve ties with other countries to secure trading partners or find new investors. Mauritania's principal benefactors have been Saudi Arabia, Kuwait, and France. The list of donors also includes Japan, Iraq, Italy, the Federal Republic of Germany (West Germany), Romania, the United States, the Persian Gulf states, and China.
