= May 1963 =

Month of 1963

<<	May 1963					>>
Su	Mo	Tu	We	Th	Fr	Sa
			1	2	3	4
5	6	7	8	9	10	11
12	13	14	15	16	17	18
19	20	21	22	23	24	25
26	27	28	29	30	31

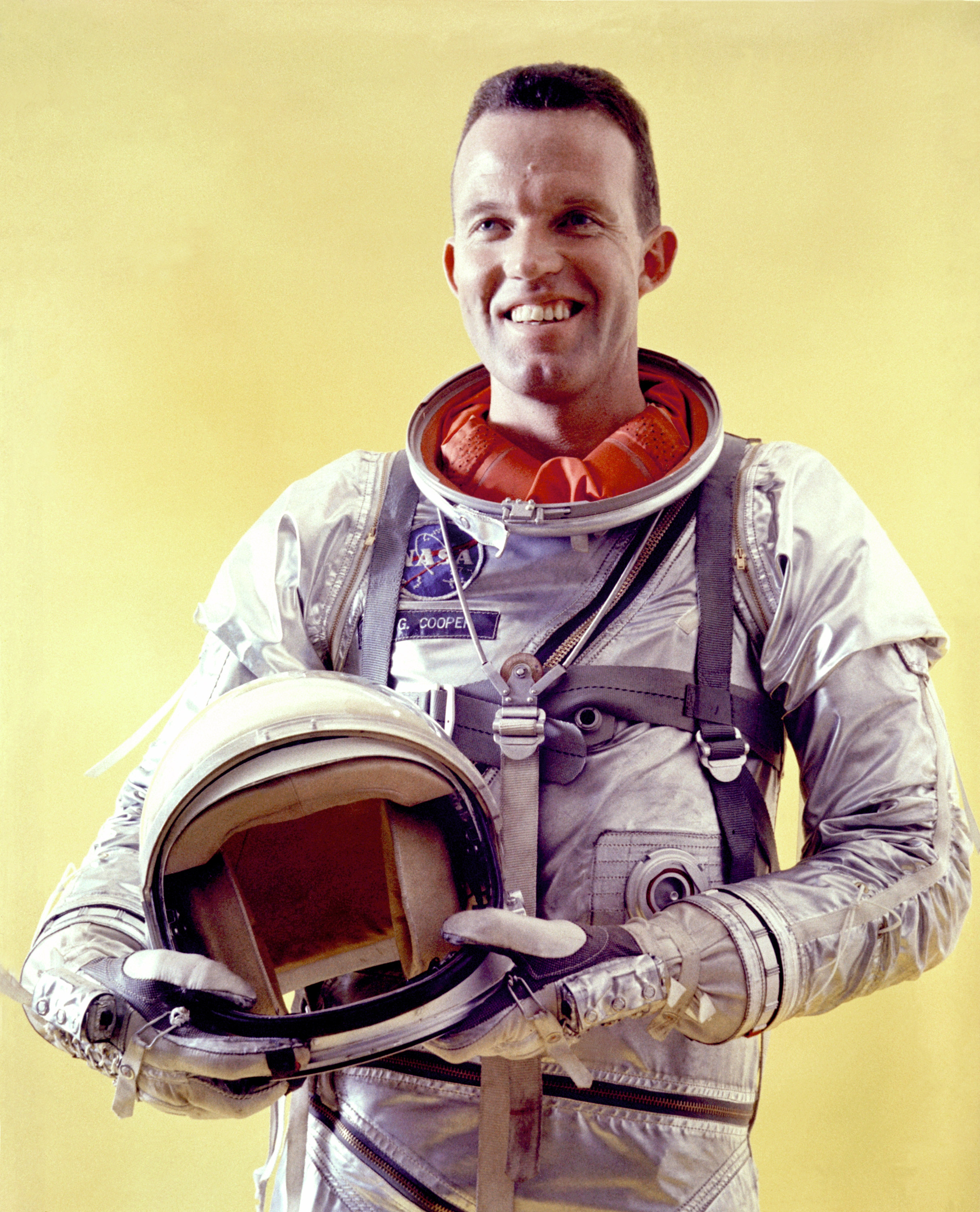
May 15, 1963: L. Gordon Cooper becomes last Mercury astronaut to go alone into space

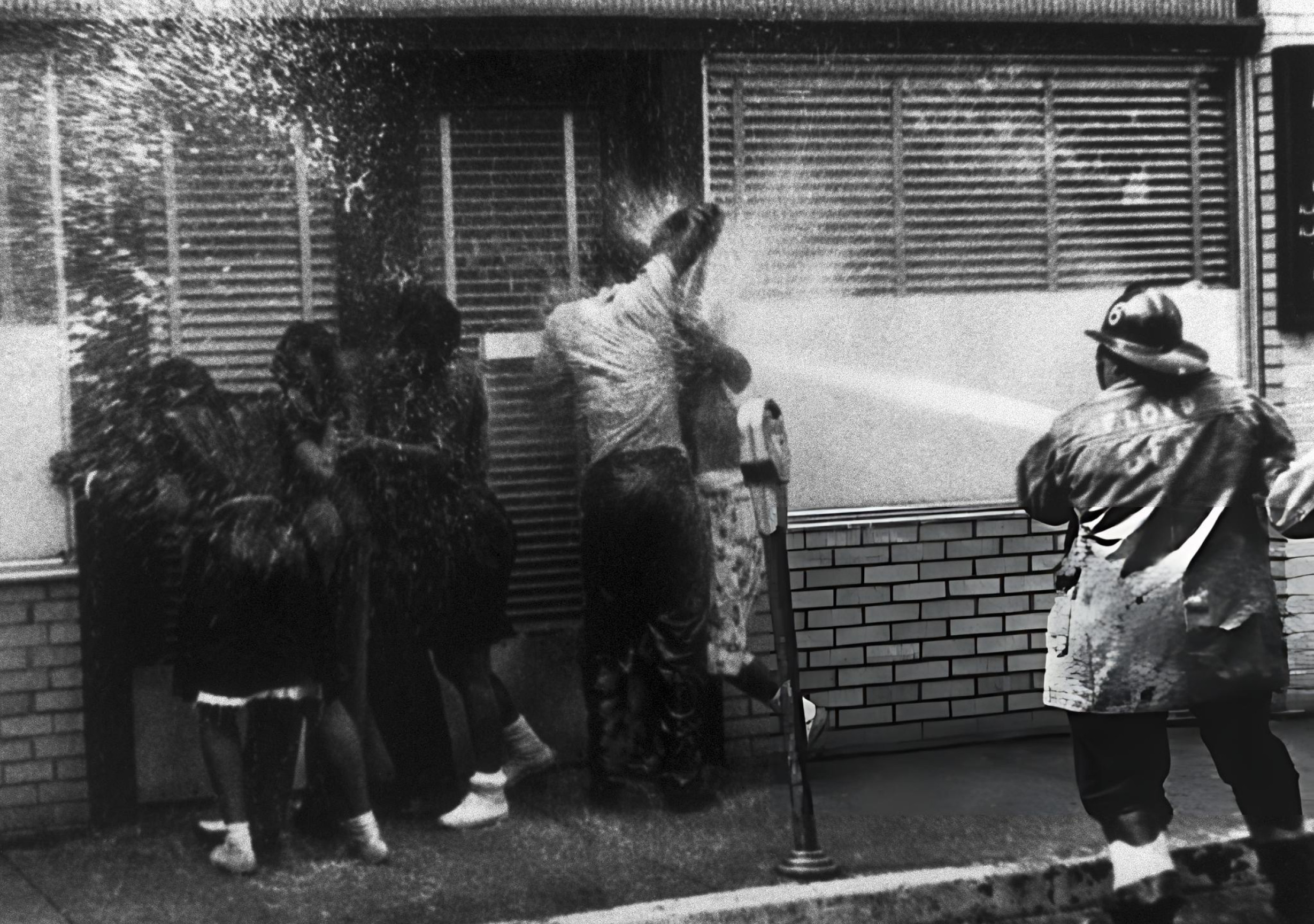
May 4, 1963: Civil rights protesters dispersed by fire hoses in Birmingham, Alabama

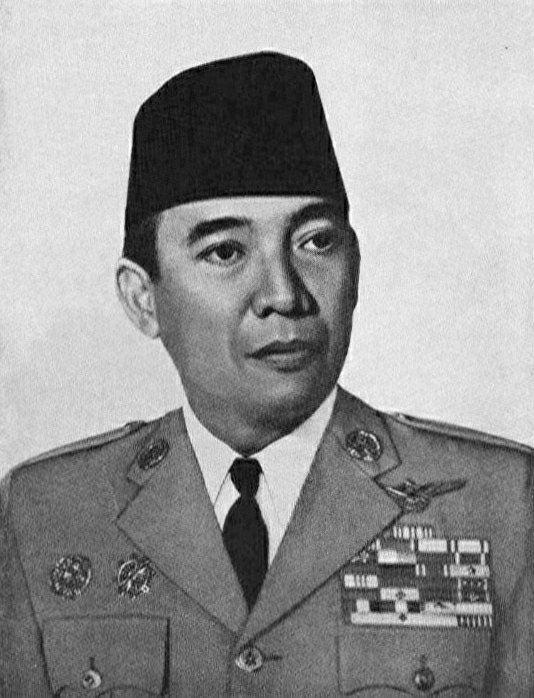
May 18, 1963: Sukarno named "President for Life" of Indonesia

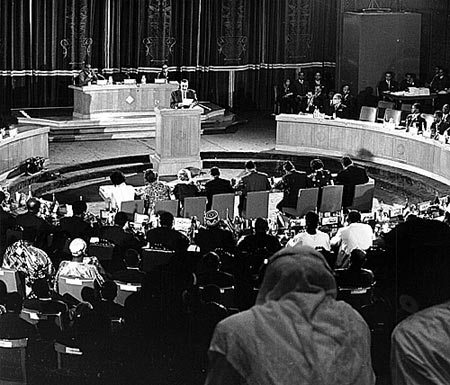
May 20, 1963: Organization of African Unity founded by 32 nations

The following events occurred in May 1963:

== May 1, 1963 (Wednesday) ==
- American mountaineer Jim Whittaker and Sherpa guide Nawang Gombu became the fifth and sixth people to successfully reach the top of Mount Everest, following Edmund Hillary and Tenzing Norgay (May 29, 1953), and Ernst Reiss and Fritz Luchsinger (May 18, 1957). Whittaker, a 32-year-old resident of Redmond, Washington, became the first American to accomplish the feat.
- McDonnell Aircraft Corporation began tests to qualify the "attitude control and maneuver electronics" (ACME) system for the Gemini spacecraft, after completing development testing. The subject of the qualification tests was the first production prototype ACME unit received from Minneapolis-Honeywell.
- West New Guinea, the last remaining Netherlands possession in what had been the Dutch East Indies, was formally transferred to Indonesian control by the United Nations in ceremonies at Hollandia. The Indonesians renamed the territory West Irian, and Hollandia was renamed Kotabaru.
- Former U.S. Vice-President (and future President) Richard M. Nixon continued his retirement from politics with the announcement that he would join the New York City law firm of Mudge, Stern, Baldwin & Todd on June 1.
- Sir Winston Churchill announced his retirement from politics at the age of 88, for reasons of health. He pledged that he would remain an M.P. until Parliament was dissolved but would not stand for re-election.
- Died: Lope K. Santos, 83, Filipino writer and politician

== May 2, 1963 (Thursday) ==
- Hundreds of African Americans, including children, were arrested during the Birmingham campaign as they set out from the Sixteenth Street Baptist Church in Birmingham, Alabama, to protest segregation. There were 959 people taken on the first day. Two days later, Public Safety Commissioner Eugene "Bull" Connor would order the use of dogs and fire hoses to repel new demonstrators, images of which were picked up by news media around the world.
- Near Cuxhaven in West Germany, Berthold Seliger launched a three-stage rocket with a maximum flight altitude of more than 62 miles (100 km). This was the only sounding rocket developed in Germany.
- Died: Jack A. Bade, 42, American World War II flying ace and test pilot, was killed in the mid-air collision of two F-105 Thunderchiefs over the Catskill Mountains in New York. The other pilot, Don Seaver, was also killed.

== May 3, 1963 (Friday) ==
- In Brazil, 37 of the 50 people on a Cruzeiro do Sul airliner were killed as the Convair CV-340 was attempting to return to São Paulo shortly after its takeoff from the Congonhas Airport. The plane had been bound for Rio de Janeiro but its right engine caught fire. In its final approach to the runway, the aircraft nosed up to a 45-degree angle, stalled and struck a house on the Avenida Piassang.
- Development testing of the Gemini Agena Model 8247 main engine at Arnold Engineering Development Center (AEDC) began, with an objective of verifying the engine's ability to start at least five times. Two major problems, turbine overspeed and gas generator valve failure in high temperature operations, were found.
- Condingup, Western Australia, was declared a townsite.

== May 4, 1963 (Saturday) ==
- The sinking of the ferry Adel drowned 173 people on the Nile River in Egypt, nearly all of them Muslim pilgrims who were beginning the journey to Mecca from the city of Maghagha. The boat's capacity was only 80 people, but more than 200 people crowded on board to make the trip. Among the 15 people who survived were the boat's captain, its owner and its conductor, who were all jailed while the matter was investigated.
- Police used high-pressure water hoses and police dogs to disperse a crowd of more than 1,000 African-American protesters in Birmingham, Alabama.
- All 55 people on an Air Afrique airliner died when the Douglas DC-6 crashed into Mount Cameroon less than half an hour after takeoff from Douala in Cameroon, bound for Lagos in Nigeria. Blame for the accident was placed on the pilot's decision to descend from 16,500 feet (5,000 m) to 6,500 feet (2,000 m) while flying toward the 13,250-foot (4,040 m) high mountain. One passenger, a U.S. diplomatic courier, initially survived the crash, but would die of his injuries on May 10.
- A fire at the Le Monde Theater in Diourbel, Senegal, killed 64 people.
- New York Governor Nelson Rockefeller secretly married his girlfriend, Margaretta "Happy" Murphy, despite being advised that his remarriage, after divorcing the year before, would hurt his chances for the Republican Party nomination for the U.S. presidency. Television comedian Carol Burnett, 28, married television producer Joe Hamilton in a ceremony in Juarez, Mexico, on the same day, after Hamilton had obtained "a quickie Mexican divorce".
- Died: Dickey Kerr, 69, American baseball pitcher for the Chicago White Sox, praised later for remaining honest during the corrupt Black Sox Scandal in 1919.

== May 5, 1963 (Sunday) ==
- After 18 years of denial, the Soviet Union confirmed that it had recovered and identified the burned remains of Adolf Hitler on April 30, 1945. Marshal Vasily Sokolovsky, the Chief of Operations during the Battle of Berlin, publicly disclosed the details to American researcher Cornelius Ryan and allowed him unprecedented access to classified documents, and allowed him and English historian John Erickson to interview fifty top-ranking officials. Sokolovsky told Ryan, "You should be informed that the Soviet Union officially regards Hitler as dead." Previously, the official Soviet position had been that of the Soviet commander, Georgy Zhukov, who had said, "We have found no body definitely identified as Hitler's. For all we know, he may be in Spain or Argentina."
- Celebrations were held in the city of Huế in South Vietnam, to honor the ordination of Ngo Dinh Thuc, elder brother of President Ngo Dinh Diem, as the Roman Catholic Archbishop of Huế. In advance of the event, the President decreed that religious banners could not be displayed above the national flag, a rule that would lead to tragedy at a Buddhist celebration three days later.
- NASA awarded a $6,700,000 contract to North American Aviation for the Paraglider Landing System Program, intended to allow NASA spacecraft to come down on land rather than splashing down at sea. The final contract would be completed on September 25.
- The 4th Pan American Games drew to a close in São Paulo, Brazil.
- Born: Kimiyasu Kudō, former Japanese professional baseball pitcher and manager; in Nagoya City

== May 6, 1963 (Monday) ==
- Graduate student Beverly Samans, 23, became the tenth murder victim of Albert DeSalvo. Unlike the first nine Boston Strangler victims, Samans was stabbed repeatedly, although he repeated his modus operandi of strangling a woman with her own stocking. Her body would be discovered three days later.
- Notable civil rights activist and comedian Dick Gregory was beaten and jailed by police while participating in the Birmingham campaign.
- The Gemini Program Planning Board approved the Air Force Systems Command development plan for the Gemini/Titan II improvement program.
- The Limitation Bill came before the UK parliament to amend the statute of limitations. The resulting act would not be fully repealed until 1980.
- Timothy Leary was dismissed from his post at Harvard University for failing to carry out his duties.
- Born: Alessandra Ferri, Italian ballerina; in Milan
- Died:
  - Theodore von Kármán, 81, Hungarian mathematician, engineer and physicist
  - Ted Weems, 61, American bandleader, died of emphysema.
  - Monty Woolley, 75, American actor

== May 7, 1963 (Tuesday) ==
- The communications satellite Telstar II was launched into Earth orbit to replace the first Telstar satellite, which had stopped functioning on February 21 because of damage by the Van Allen radiation belts. As with the first Telstar, the satellite amplified the signals that it was receiving from ground station transmitters.
- Aerojet-General delivered the first flight engines for the Gemini 1 rocket to Martin-Baltimore. Tests were completed May 27.
- Died: Max Miller, 68, British stand-up comedian

== May 8, 1963 (Wednesday) ==
- The Hue Vesak shootings took place when soldiers of the Army of the Republic of Vietnam (ARVN) shot and killed eight people while firing on Buddhists who had defied a ban on the flying of the Buddhist flag on Vesak, the birthday of Gautama Buddha. Earlier, South Vietnam's President Ngo Dinh Diem allowed the flying of the Vatican flag, symbolic of Roman Catholicism, in honor of his brother, Archbishop Ngo Dinh Thuc.
- The James Bond film, Dr. No, premiered in the United States. The film had been seen in Europe since its premiere in London on October 5, 1962.
- CVS Pharmacy, originally named the Consumer Value Stores from 1963 to 1969, was founded in Lowell, Massachusetts.
- Born: Anthony Field, Australian musician, leader of the children's entertainment group The Wiggles; in Kellyville, New South Wales

== May 9, 1963 (Thursday) ==
- Testing of the Gemini parachute recovery system began at El Centro, California, as a welded steel mock-up of the Gemini reentry section was dropped from a C-130 aircraft at 20,000 feet (6,100 m) to duplicate dynamic pressure and altitude at which actual spacecraft recovery would be initiated. The main problem, parachute tucking (which had appeared to be resolved earlier) recurred in two drops and the Gemini Project Office would suspend testing until the condition could be corrected. Qualification testing resumed August 8.
- After the first six attempts at a successful launch of the MIDAS (Missile Defense Alarm System) satellite failed, MIDAS 7 was successfully placed into a polar orbit. During the first three years of attempts, three satellites failed to reach orbit, while the other three suffered power failures. MIDAS 7 would operate for 47 days and would detect nine Soviet missile launches.

== May 10, 1963 (Friday) ==
- A settlement was reached between the Southern Christian Leadership Conference (SCLC) and the leading business owners of Birmingham, Alabama, with the SCLC agreeing to call off its boycott of local retailers, who in return "agreed to desegregate lunch counters, rest rooms, fitting rooms and drinking fountains" and to hire more African-Americans for sales and clerical jobs.
- Author Maurice Sendak, working on his first book for children, made the decision to abandon his original title, Where the Wild Horses Are, after concluding that horses were too difficult to draw, and changed the characters in the book to friendly monsters. The book, Where the Wild Things Are, would become a Caldecott Medal winning bestseller and launch Sendak's career.
- Born: Sławomir Skrzypek, Polish financier; in Katowice (killed in plane crash, 2010)
- Died:
  - Eugene "Big Daddy" Lipscomb, 31, American NFL player for the Pittsburgh Steelers, died of a heroin overdose.
  - Léonce Crenier, 74, French Catholic monk who promoted the theological/political concept of Precarity

== May 11, 1963 (Saturday) ==
- Canada's new Prime Minister, Lester B. Pearson, agreed to allow American nuclear weapons to be placed in Canada, following a two-day meeting with U.S. President John F. Kennedy at the President's private estate in Hyannis Port, Massachusetts.
- Born: Natasha Richardson, English actress, daughter of Vanessa Redgrave and Tony Richardson (d. 2009); in Marylebone
- Died: Herbert Spencer Gasser, 74, American neurophysiologist and 1944 Nobel Prize laureate

== May 12, 1963 (Sunday) ==
- Dr. Charles A. Berry, chief medical officer of the Manned Spacecraft Center (MSC), cleared Gordon Cooper as being in excellent mental and physical condition for the upcoming Mercury 9 mission. The first of 1,020 members of the news media from the U.S. and other nations began arriving at Cape Canaveral the same day to cover Cooper's mission.
- Scheduled to make his nationwide television debut on The Ed Sullivan Show, folk singer Bob Dylan refused to perform after censors at the CBS network would not clear him to sing "Talkin' John Birch Paranoid Blues". Dylan would go on to greater fame, singing with Joan Baez in August during the "March on Washington".
- Kenji Kimihara of Japan won the Lake Biwa Marathon, Japan's oldest annual marathon race.

== May 13, 1963 (Monday) ==
- The U.S. Supreme Court decided the case of Brady v. Maryland, setting the principle that in before trial in a criminal case, the prosecution disclose any exculpatory evidence (which might exonerate the defendant) to the defense team. Named for accused killer John Leo Brady, the "Brady disclosure" is now a requirement for prosecutors. Brady, who had been sentenced to death in the original 1958 case, would be afforded a new trial, resulting in a sentence of life imprisonment, from which he would eventually be paroled.
- A smallpox outbreak was first detected in Stockholm in Sweden and would not be under control until July.
- The comic strip Modesty Blaise made its debut in England as part of the Evening Standard of London.

== May 14, 1963 (Tuesday) ==
- The scheduled launch of Mercury 9 was halted after the countdown had reached T-60 minutes, because of difficulty in the fuel pump of the diesel engine that would pull the gantry away during liftoff. After a delay of more than two hours for repairs, countdown resumed but was halted again at T-13 minutes, when the Bermuda tracking station reported a failure of a computer converter important in the orbital insertion decision, forcing the launch to be scrubbed. At 6:00 p.m. local time, MSC's Walter C. Williams reported that the Bermuda equipment had been repaired, and the launch was rescheduled for the next day.
- In Denmark, the Frederick IX Bridge was officially opened, spanning the Guldborgsund strait between the islands of Falster and Lolland.
- The Rolling Stones signed their first recording contract, after talent scout Dick Rowe asked them to audition for Decca Records.
- The new office of Parliamentary Secretary was created in the Canadian government.
- Kuwait became the 111th member of the United Nations, over the objections of Iraq.
- Died: Harold Stanley, 77, American businessman and one of the founders of Morgan Stanley in 1935

== May 15, 1963 (Wednesday) ==
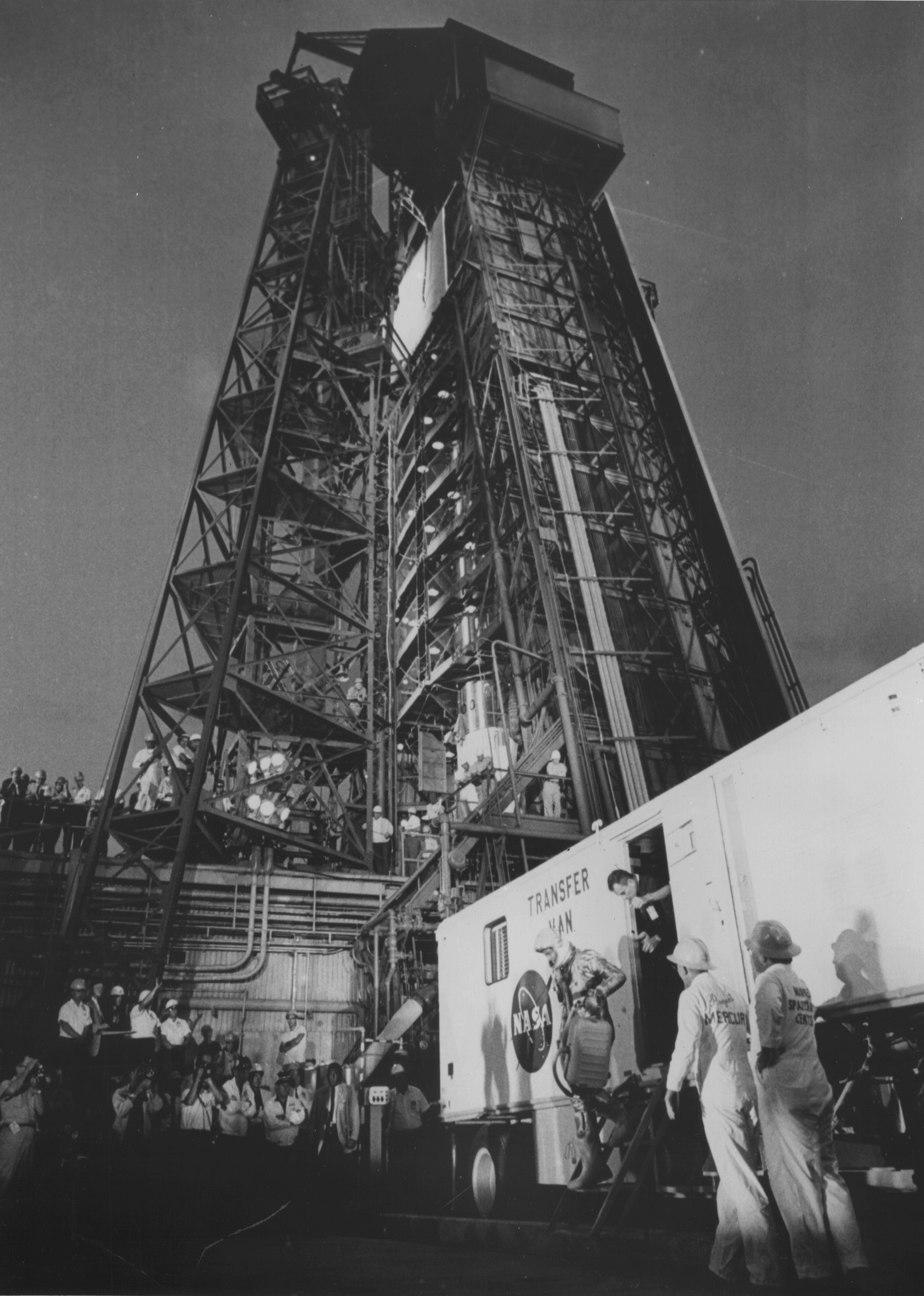
May 15, 1963: Gordon Cooper leaves transfer van at launchpad

- At 8:04 a.m. at (1304 UTC), NASA launched Mercury 9 from Cape Canaveral, with astronaut L. Gordon Cooper in the capsule designated Faith 7. Cooper's 22-orbit mission was the last for the Mercury program. Cooper entered the spacecraft at 5:33 a.m. (1033 UTC) for an 8:00 launch, and took a brief nap while awaiting liftoff. At T-minus 11 minutes and 30 seconds the countdown was halted for a problem in the guidance equipment, and another hold was called at T-0:19 to determine whether automatic sequencing was working. Liftoff happened four minutes after the original time, and visual tracking was possible for two minutes. Five minutes after liftoff at 8:09 a.m., Faith 7 was inserted into an orbit that ranged from 100.2 miles (161.3 km) to 165.9 miles (267.0 km) above the Earth and reached a maximum orbital speed of 17,546.6 miles per hour (28,238.5 km/h). Temperatures inside the capsule ranged from 92 °F (33 °C) to 109 °F (43 °C), uncomfortable but tolerable, before cooling down. During his third orbit, Cooper became the first human to launch an object (the beacon) from an orbiting spacecraft. Cooper was able to see the flashing beacon on the night side of the fourth orbit.
- Housewife Jean Nidetch founded the Weight Watchers company, with the first meeting held at a loft above a movie theater in Little Neck, a neighborhood in the New York City borough of Queens.

== May 16, 1963 (Thursday) ==
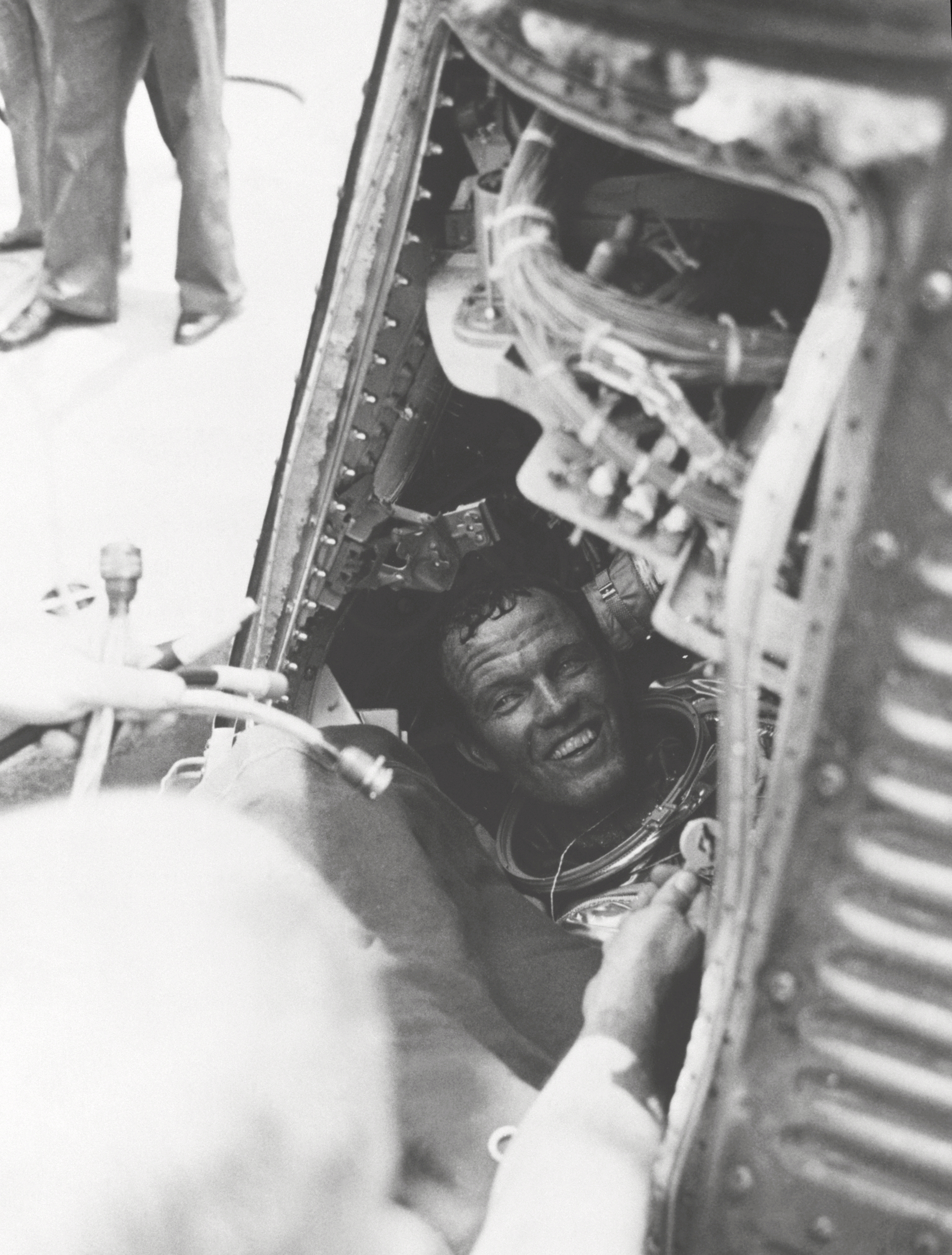
May 16, 1963: Gordon Cooper inside Faith 7 aboard carrier USS Kearsarge

- Astronaut Gordon Cooper returned to Earth safely after making 22 orbits and traveling 546,167 miles (878,971 km) in the Faith 7 capsule. During reentry operation, Cooper fired the retrorockets manually and attained the proper re-entry attitude by using his observation window scribe marks to give proper reference with the horizon and to determine if he were rolling. From the command ship in the Pacific Ocean off the Japanese coast, John Glenn advised Cooper when to jettison the retropack. The main chute deployed at 11,000 feet (3,400 m). Faith 7 splashed down 7,000 yards (6,400 m) from the prime recovery ship, USS Kearsarge (CV-33), at 2323 UTC after 34 hours, 19 minutes, and 49 seconds in space flight.
- Died: Oleg Penkovsky, 44, formerly a Soviet Army colonel and spy, was executed five days after being sentenced to death by a military tribunal for passing secrets to the United States and the United Kingdom.

== May 17, 1963 (Friday) ==
- A U.S. Army OH-23 helicopter with two men on board, Captains Ben W. Stutts and Charleton W. Voltz, was shot down by North Korean ground forces after straying north of the Demilitarized Zone. The two men would be freed, after 365 days of imprisonment, on May 16, 1964, following the United Nations Command agreeing to sign a statement that Stutts and Voltz had committed espionage. North Korea declined to return the helicopter.
- Challenger Bruno Sammartino faced champion Buddy Rogers of the World Wide Wrestling Federation (now WWE) in a professional wrestling match at New York's Madison Square Garden. Sammartino, using his signature move, "the Italian backbreaker", defeated Rogers in only 48 seconds, and would reign as the WWWF champion for the next eight years.

== May 18, 1963 (Saturday) ==
- An accident killed 27 people, 12 of them children, who all drowned when their bus they were on was sideswiped by a passing pickup truck, and plunged into the 16-foot (4.9 m) deep Hillsboro Canal near Belle Glade, Florida. Only the driver and 14 people survived. The victims were African-American farm laborers and their families, on their way home from a day of work of harvesting beans at the Kirchman Brothers Farm.
- Rocketdyne successfully tested a 25-pound-force (110 N) thrust chamber assembly (TCA) for the Gemini reentry control system. The development of a suitable ablative thrust chamber, however, remained a major problem, and testing was incomplete. Rocketdyne was already three months late in delivering TCA hardware to McDonnell, and completion of testing took three months longer than predicted.
- Sukarno (sometimes referred to as Ahmed Sukarno) was named as President for Life of Indonesia. Sukarno, who had ruled since 1945, would serve for another four years before being deposed, and would spend the rest of his life afterward under house arrest, dying on June 21, 1970.
- Died: Ernie Davis, 23, African-American football star who won the 1961 Heisman Trophy while at Syracuse University; of leukemia. He had been diagnosed after signing with the NFL's Cleveland Browns.

== May 19, 1963 (Sunday) ==
- Astronaut Gordon Cooper appeared at a national televised press conference to answer questions about the Mercury 9 mission. During the flight, he had seen the haze layer previously reported by Wally Schirra of Mercury 8 and John Glenn's "fireflies" seen on Mercury 6. Cooper's most astonishing revelation was his ability visually to distinguish objects on the earth, including an African town where the flashing light experiment was conducted; several Australian cities including large oil refineries at Perth; and wisps of smoke from rural houses in Asia. At the same conference, Dr. Robert C. Seamans said that a Mercury 10 flight was "quite unlikely."
- British driver Bob Anderson won the 1963 Rome Grand Prix.

== May 20, 1963 (Monday) ==
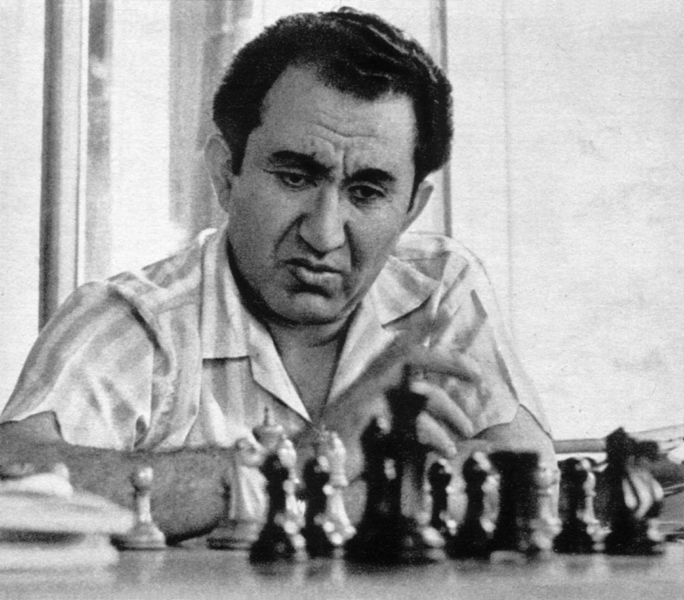
Petrosian

- Tigran Petrosian won the World Chess Championship, defeating fellow Soviet grandmaster and world champion Mikhail Botvinnik, 12 1/2 to 9 1/2, to win the match after 22 games. Under the rules, Petrosian's five wins (worth one point each) and 15 draws (1/2 point each) brought him to 12 1/2 points first to win the series.
- African-American civil rights activist Medgar Evers went on the air on the WLBT-TV News in Jackson, Mississippi, to deliver an editorial in favor of integration and civil rights. WLBT allowed the unprecedented use of its airtime after pressure from the Federal Communications Commission to permit a response to segregationists. Evers would be murdered at his home three weeks later, on June 12.
- The members of NASA Astronaut Group 2 completed a zero-gravity indoctrination program at Wright-Patterson Air Force Base near Dayton, Ohio, in a modified KC-135 aircraft which carried the astronauts on two flights each. Each flight included 20 zero-gravity parabolas, each lasting 30 seconds.
- The Dutch Wonderland Family Amusement Park was opened by potato broker Earl Clark opened near Lancaster, Pennsylvania.
- Born: David "Boomer" Wells, American baseball player, known for pitching a perfect game (1998) and for being the American League's leader in wins (2000); in Torrance, California

== May 21, 1963 (Tuesday) ==
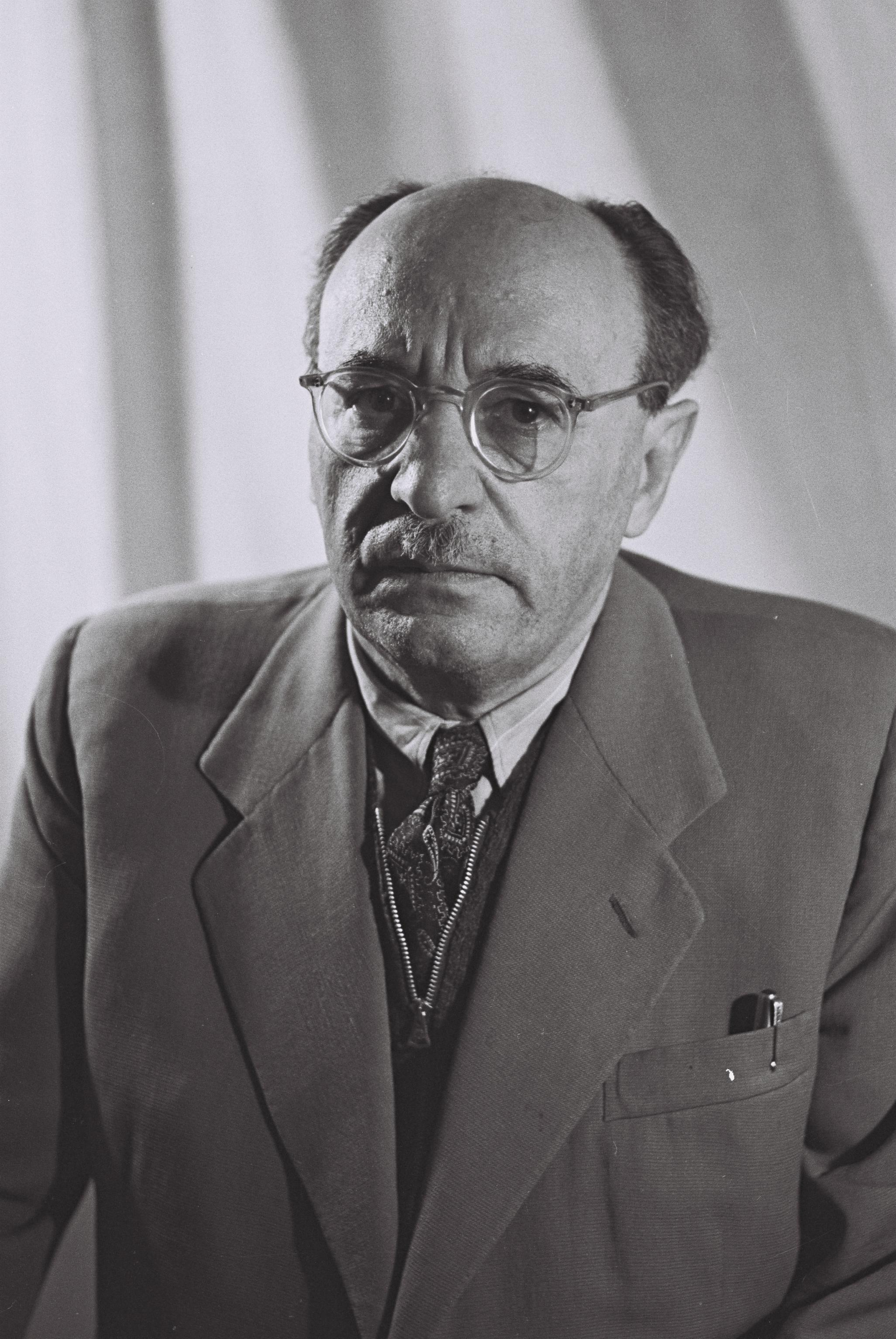
President Shazar

- Zalman Shazar was elected by the Knesset as the third President of Israel, winning 67–33 over Peretz Bernstein. As with the first two Presidents of Israel (Chaim Weizmann and Yitzhak Ben-Zvi), Shazar was a native of Russia. He had been born as Shneur Zalman Rubashov in Mir, now part of Belarus.
- Representatives of NASA, the U.S. Air Force Space Systems Division, and Lockheed established new rules for revising Agena development and delivery schedules, moving the Agena target vehicle rendezvous to April 1965, more than seven months after the original date. The first Atlas target launch vehicle was to be delivered in December 1964, and the Agena was to be delivered in January 1965.
- MSC began the Gemini atmospheric reentry simulation study to evaluate manual control of the Gemini spacecraft during reentry, before beginning the centrifuge program to be conducted at Naval Air Development Center.
- Born: Kevin Shields, American-born Irish musician, singer-songwriter, composer and producer, best known as the vocalist and guitarist of the band My Bloody Valentine; in Queens, New York City

== May 22, 1963 (Wednesday) ==
- Greek anti-Fascist politician Grigoris Lambrakis was assassinated shortly after delivering the keynote speech at an anti-war meeting in Thessaloniki. Lambrakis was run down by a trikyklo (a three-wheeled delivery truck) and then clubbed to death by hired killers. He suffered brain injuries and died in the hospital five days later. The assassination would become the basis for a novel by Vassilis Vassilikos, which later was adapted to the 1969 film Z.
- Lamar Hunt, owner of the American Football League's champion, the Dallas Texans, moved the team to Kansas City, Missouri, where they would be renamed the Kansas City Chiefs. The AFL trustees approved the move a week later.
- Born: David Bloom, American television journalist for NBC News, who died of a pulmonary embolism while covering the Iraq War (d. 2003); in Edina, Minnesota

== May 23, 1963 (Thursday) ==
- The first successful interception of an orbiting satellite by a ground-based missile took place as part of the American program, Project MUDFLAP. A Nike-Zeus missile, launched from Kwajalein Atoll, passed close enough to an orbiting Lockheed Agena-D satellite to have disabled it with an explosion. Seven other tests would be made, ending on January 13, 1966.
- The prototype of the onboard Gemini Guidance Computer completed integration and was delivered by International Business Machines Corporation (IBM) to McDonnell Aircraft for further tests.
- AS Monaco won the Coupe de France soccer football competition, defeating Olympique Lyonnais 2–0 at Parc des Princes.

== May 24, 1963 (Friday) ==
- The New York Journal-American reported in a copyrighted story that NASA had revealed in a closed session of a congressional subcommittee that there had been five fatalities in the Soviet cosmonaut program, all of which had been covered up. According to the source, Serenty Shiborin had been the first man in space, launched in February 1959 and was "never heard of again after 28 minutes when the signals went dead". Other failed launches were said to have been Piotr Dolgov on October 11, 1960; Vassilievitch Zowodovsky in April 1961; and two persons, possibly a man and a woman, launched together on May 17, 1961. Alexei Adzhubei, the editor of the newspaper Izvestia and the son-in-law of Soviet Premier Nikita Khrushchev, denied the reports of four of the five deaths in the newspaper's May 27 edition, saying that the people had been "technicians working on space equipment" and that two of them were still alive, although no denial was made about the alleged 1959 death of Siborin.
- U.S. Attorney General Robert F. Kennedy invited James Baldwin and other Black leaders to discuss race relations at his apartment in Manhattan. The turbulent meeting gained wide publicity and had a significant impact on Kennedy.
- Project Emily ended in the UK as the last squadron of Thor nuclear missile stations, located at RAF Hemswell, was disbanded.
- Born: Michael Chabon, American novelist (The Mysteries of Pittsburgh); in Washington, D.C.
- Died: Elmore James, 45, American blues musician and 1992 inductee to the Rock and Roll Hall of Fame. died of a heart attack.

== May 25, 1963 (Saturday) ==
- At the track and field competition for six universities in what is now the Pac-12 Conference, Phil Shinnick jumped 27 feet 4 inches (8.33 m) in the long jump, 0.75 inches (19 mm) ahead of the world record set by Igor Ter-Ovanesyan, but "two officials, whose only duty was to place the wind gauge on the long jump runway and watch it to make sure the wind was blowing at less than the allowable limit, were not paying attention", so the mark was not submitted as a world record.
- The Organization of African Unity (OAU) was established in Addis Ababa, Ethiopia, by representatives from 32 African nations. On July 9, 2002, the OAU, by then with 53 members, would be replaced by the African Union.
- President Antonio Segni asked Aldo Moro to become the new Prime Minister of Italy.
- Born: Mike Myers, Canadian comedian and TV and film actor known for Wayne's World, Austin Powers and Shrek series of films; in Scarborough, Ontario

== May 26, 1963 (Sunday) ==
- Less than two years after he had been released from years of imprisonment, Jomo Kenyatta was assured to become the first Prime Minister of Kenya when his Kenya African National Union won 83 of the 129 seats in the National Assembly in the Kenyan national election.
- A rare case of two independent tornadic thunderstorms, near Oklahoma City, yielded data that would lead to the recognition of "a new stage in the development of thunderstorms: the severe/right-moving, or SR, stage".
- Afghanistan and Pakistan agreed to resume diplomatic relations that had been severed on September 6, 1960, following a conference between officials in Tehran at the invitation of the Shah of Iran.
- The 1963 Monaco Grand Prix was won by Graham Hill.
- Born:
  - Mary Nightingale, English newsreader and television presenter; in Scarborough, North Yorkshire
  - Simon Armitage, British poet, playwright and novelist; in Huddersfield
  - Phil Pavlov, American politician and member of the Michigan Legislature from 2005 to 2018

== May 27, 1963 (Monday) ==
- North American began testing the half-scale two test vehicle (HSTTV) for the Paraglider Landing System Program to investigate paraglider liftoff characteristics, helicopter tow techniques, and the effects of wind-bending during high-speed tows.
- Columbia Records released The Freewheelin' Bob Dylan, singer-songwriter Bob Dylan's second and most influential studio album, which opened with the song "Blowin' in the Wind".
- Died: Grigoris Lambrakis, 50, Greek politician, physician and Olympic athlete, died five days after being attacked. More than 500,000 people attended his funeral the next day and marched in protest against Greece's right-wing government.

== May 28, 1963 (Tuesday) ==
- A cyclone killed 22,000 people in and around the city of Comilla in East Pakistan (now Bangladesh). Winds as high as 150 miles per hour (240 km/h) ripped the countryside, and "the many offshore islands were literally swept clean of people"; Chittagong and Cox's Bazar lost 5,000 people each, and waves were powerful enough to send ships 0.5 miles (0.80 km) inland, including four ocean liners.
- Born: Gavin Harrison, British drummer; in Harrow
- Died: Klaus Clusius, 60, German physical chemist

== May 29, 1963 (Wednesday) ==
- Titan II flight N-20, the 19th in the series of Air Force research and development flights, failed 55 seconds after liftoff from Cape Canaveral and yielded no data. The U.S. Air Force announced that no further Titan II development flights would carry the POGO fix, but the decision was reversed and POGO fix was flown again on Titan II flight N-25 and two later flights.
- The vertical test facility (VTF) at Martin-Baltimore was activated with a 165-foot (50 m) tower and an adjacent three-story blockhouse with ground equipment similar to that used at NASA's Complex 19. After systems tests concluded, the launch vehicle was presented to the U.S. Air Force for acceptance.
- On the 50th anniversary of its stormy premiere, The Rite of Spring was performed by the London Symphony Orchestra, conducted by 88-year-old Pierre Monteux at the Royal Albert Hall. The composer, 81-year-old Igor Stravinsky, was in the audience as an honored guest.
- Jim Reeves was welcomed to Ireland by show band singers Maisie McDaniel and Dermot O'Brien, at the start of his tour of Ireland, and conducted a week-long tour of U.S. military bases in England.
- The U.S. Department of Defense submitted its report on the Mercury 9 mission.
- Born:
  - Tom Burnett, American businessman who was one of the passengers who fought with terrorists during the hijacking of United Airlines Flight 93 during the September 11 attacks (d. 2001); in Bloomington, Minnesota
  - Lisa Whelchel, American TV actress and Contemporary Christian singer, best known as Blair Warner on The Facts of Life; in Littlefield, Texas
- Died: Vissarion Shebalin, 61, Soviet classical composer

== May 30, 1963 (Thursday) ==
- More than 500 monks demonstrated in front of South Vietnam's National Assembly building in Saigon, evading a ban on public assembly by hiring four buses and pulling the blinds down. It was the first open protest against President Ngô Đình Diệm's regime since he came into power eight years earlier.

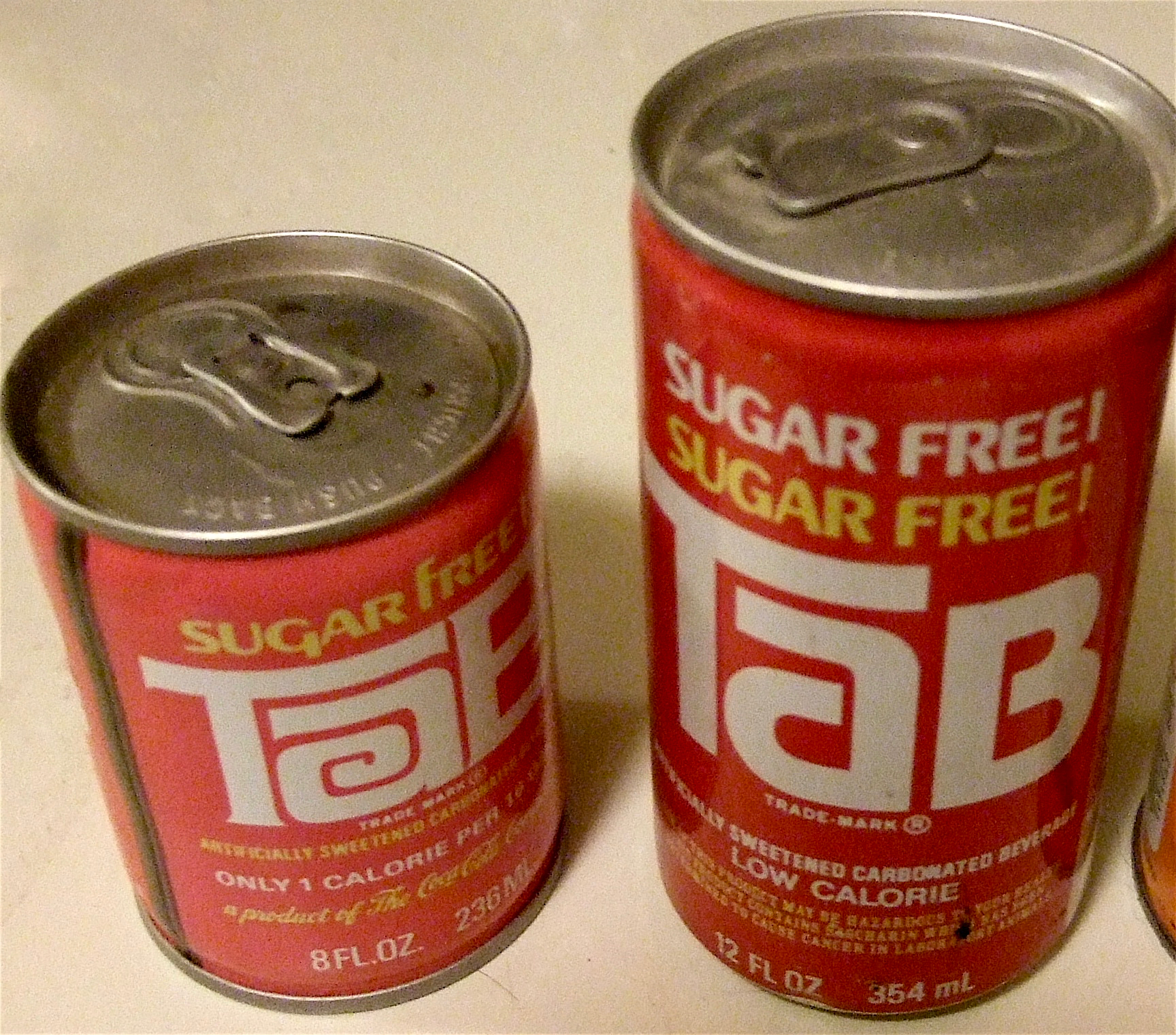
TaB cola

- The Coca-Cola Company publicly announced its first diet drink, "TaB cola", with "one calorie per six-ounce serving" made with saccharin instead of sugar.
- Parnelli Jones of the United States won the 1963 Indianapolis 500, finishing 34 seconds ahead of Jim Clark of Scotland.

== May 31, 1963 (Friday) ==
- The ABC Theatre, created by Associated British Cinemas, opened at the English seaside resort of Blackpool, Lancashire, beginning with the Holiday Carnival summer season stage show, starring Cliff Richard and The Shadows.
- The USAF's Winslow Air Force Station in Winslow, Arizona, ceased operations.
- Born: Viktor Orbán, former prime minister of Hungary
- Died: Edith Hamilton, 95, German-born American classical scholar best known for her authorship of Mythology: Timeless Tales of Gods and Heroes
