= Cläre Mjøen =

German-Norwegian translator and women's rights activitst (1874–1963)

Cläre Grevérus Mjøen
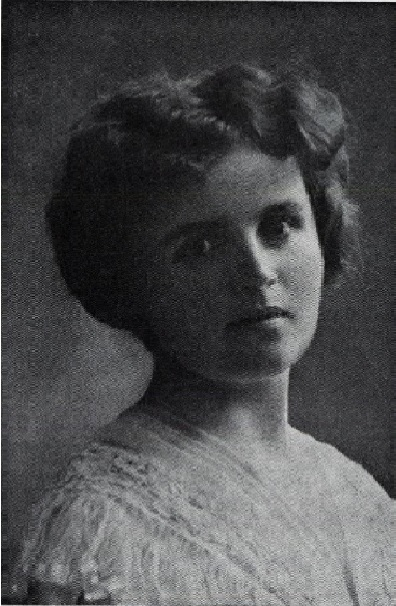
- Cläre Mjøen in 1907
- Born: Cläre Grevérus Berndt; 5 June 1874; Magdeburg, Saxony-Anhalt, Kingdom of Prussia
- Died: 18 April 1963 (aged 88); Vestre Aker, Oslo, Østlandet, Norway
- Burial place: Østre Fredrikstad Cemetery, Fredrikstad, Østfold, Norway
- Occupations: translator and women's rights activist
- Organization: Norwegian National Women's Council
- Children: 6

Cläre Grevérus Mjøen (née Berndt, 5 June 1874 – 18 April 1963) was a German and Norwegian translator, women's rights activist and eugenicist.

== Early life ==
Mjøen was born in Magdeburg, then part of the Kingdom of Prussia, in 1874. Her father Rudolph Berndt was the director of the German insurance company Magdeburger Feuerversicherungs-Gesellschaft and her mother was Emilie Grevérus. She was educated in languages, art history, singing and piano at a school for girls in Switzerland.

== Marriage ==
Mjøen married pharmacist and “race biologist” Jon Alfred Mjøen in Magdeburg in 1896. She moved to Christiania, Norway in 1898 and the couple had six children together, five of whom became actors. The Mjøen family were close friends with first Nobel Laureate in Literature, Bjørnstjerne Bjørnson.

== Career ==
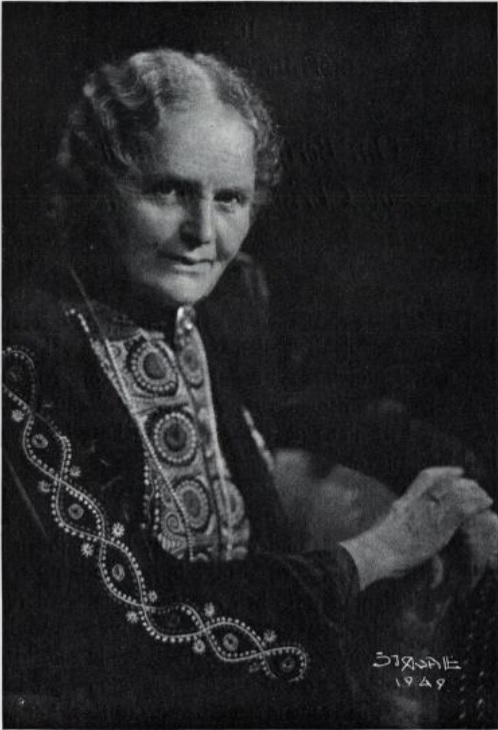
Cläre Mjøen in 1949

Mjøen translated literature from Norwegian to German. Her translations included Knut Hamsun's travel writing and short stories, along with works by Andreas Aubert, Bjørnson, Georg Brandes, Nordahl Grieg, Barbra Ring, Gunnar Larsen, Wilhelm Keilhau, Kristian Schjelderup and Herman Wildenvey.

== Activism ==
Mjøen was also active in the women's rights movement and was the general secretary of the Norwegian National Women's Council for 12 years. She supported the recognition of illegitimate children's rights, feeling that this improved the position of single mothers and their children.

Mjøen also wrote some articles on "race biology."

== Death ==
Mjøen died in 1963 in Vestre Aker, Oslo, Norway.
