= Åskollen =

Settlement in Drammen, Norway

Coordinates: 59°42′45.73″N 10°15′37.96″E

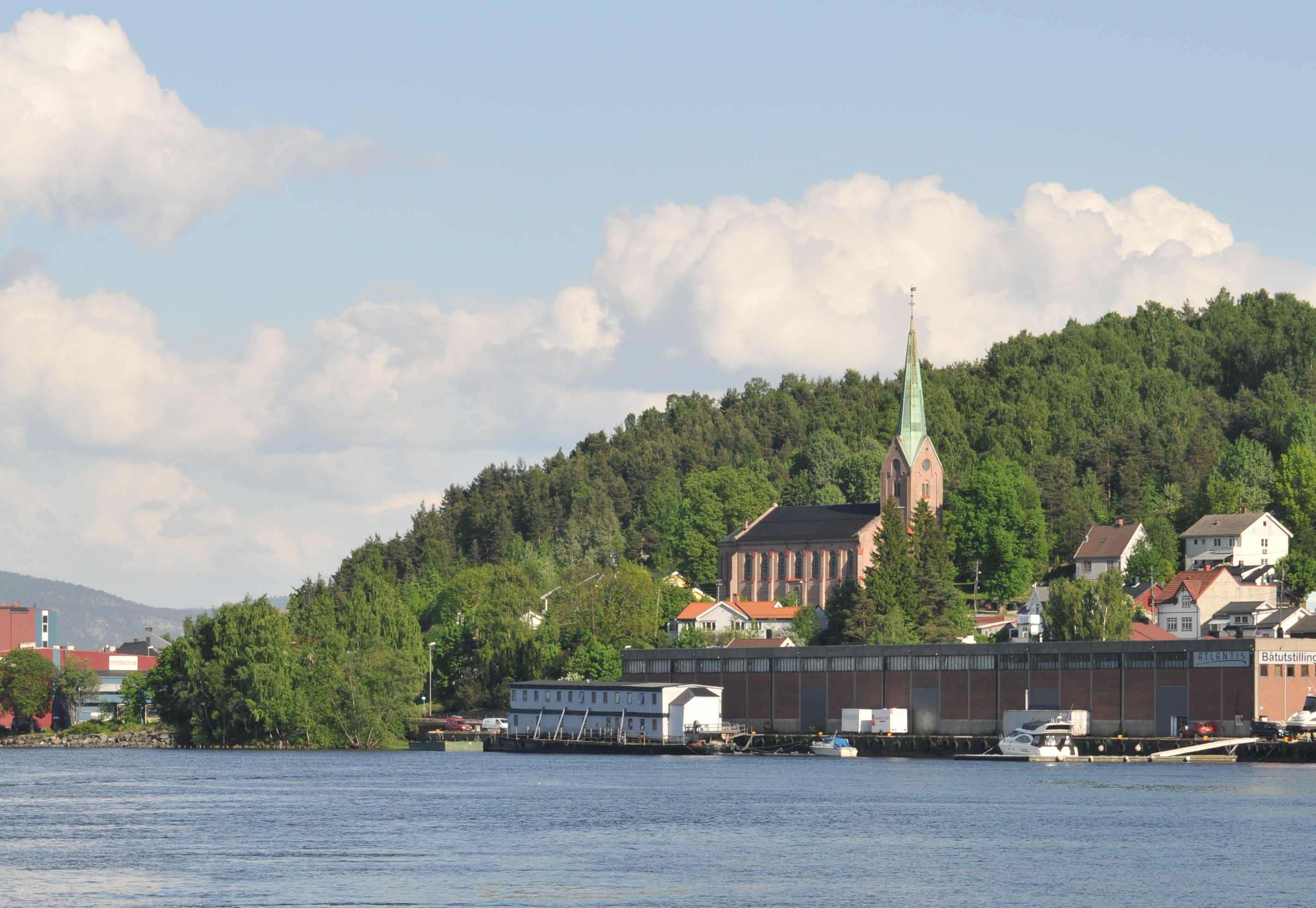
Åskollen

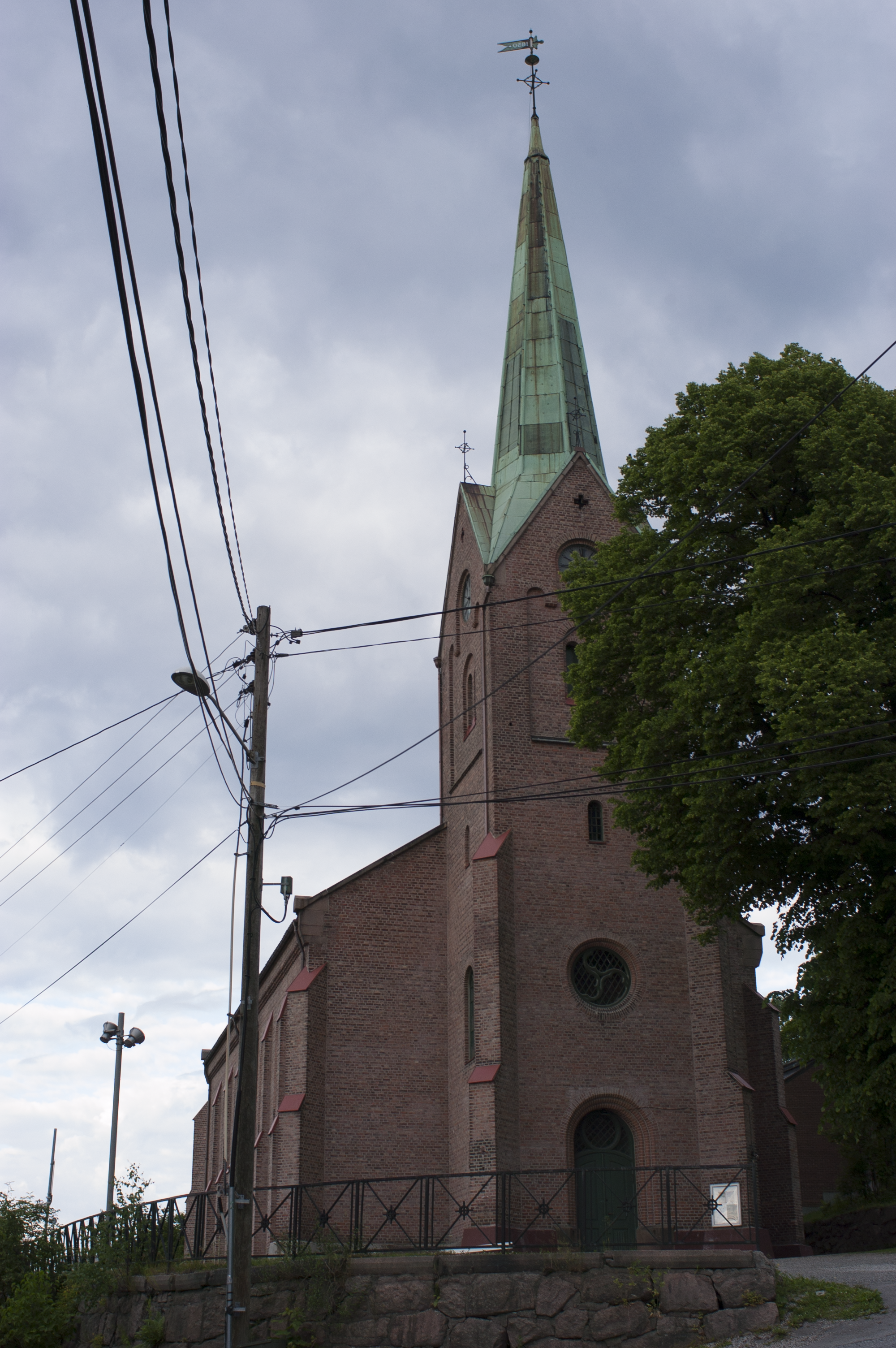
Tangen Church

Åskollen is a part of the borough of Tangen-Åskollen in the city of Drammen, Norway. Tangen-Åskollen is one of the eight districts in Drammen and had 6,123 inhabitants (2002). Tangen-Åskollen is located south-east of the city centre. Before 1964 Åskollen was a part of Skoger municipality.

Tangen Church (Tangen Kirke) was inaugurated on 25 January 1854. The design was by architect Heinrich Ernst Schirmer. The altarpiece titled "Christ in Gethsemane" (Jesus i Getsemane), was made by Johan Fredrik Eckersberg in 1852. There is a marble baptismal font from 1784, four chandeliers and Holy Bible from 1722. The church has stained glass windows made in 1928 by Norwegian painter Åsmund Esval and an organ from 1934 was made by Josef Hilmar Jørgensen (1892–1961).

Traditionally the communities of Tangen and Åskollen were principally engaged in agriculture and forestry. Seafaring and shipbuilding were early industries. Dating from the early 19th century, a number of companies developed along the shoreline, including an iron foundry from 1847.

Drammen Glassworks (Drammen Glassverk) started in 1873 and was closed in 1977. Drammen Glassworks was owned by the joint venture Hurdal, Biri and Hadeland Glassworks. During the 1890s, the factory was the largest single local employer and the principal source of window glass made within Norway.

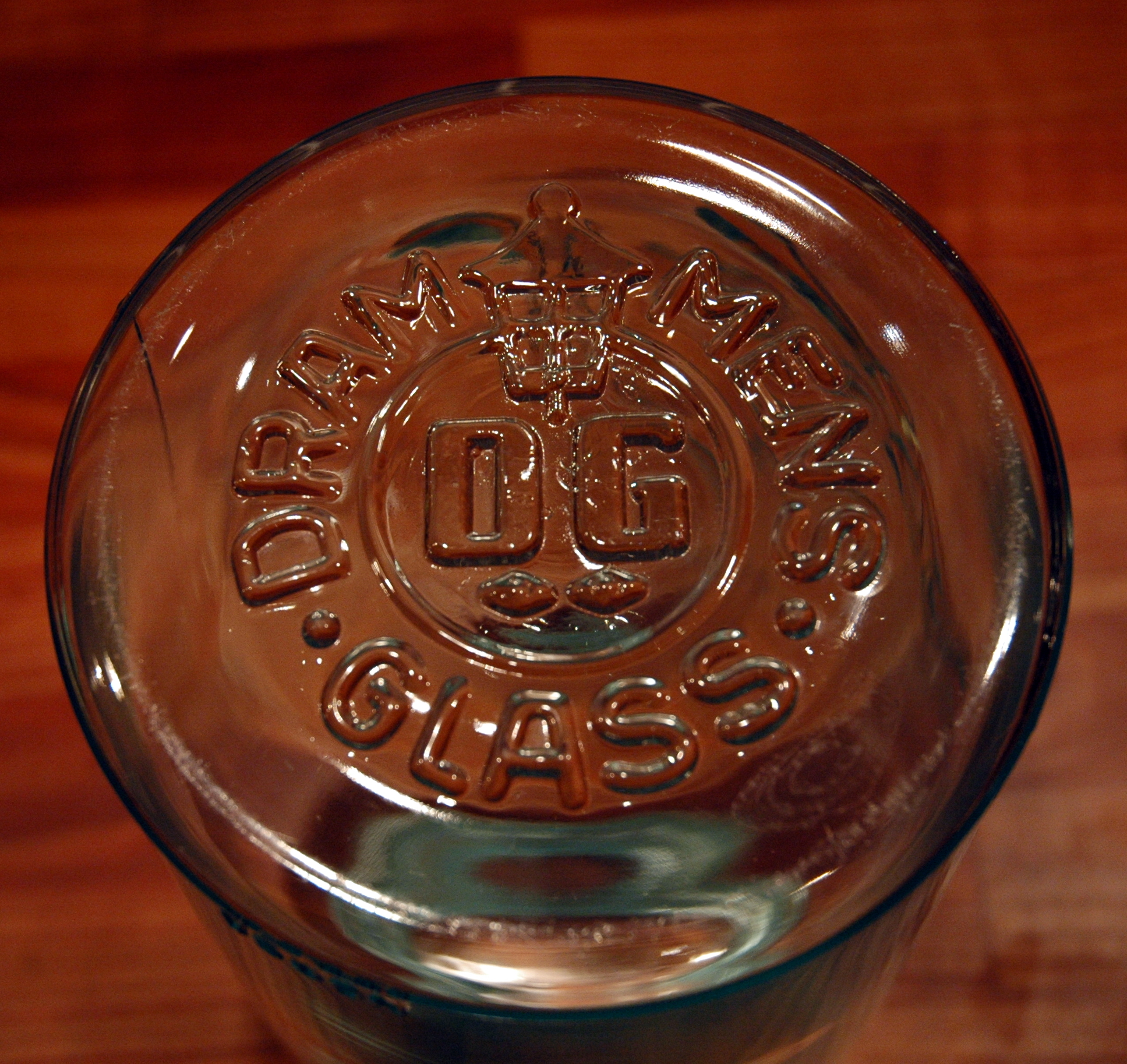
Drammen Glassworks manufacturer's mark
