= André Faye Solvang =

Norwegian motorboat racer

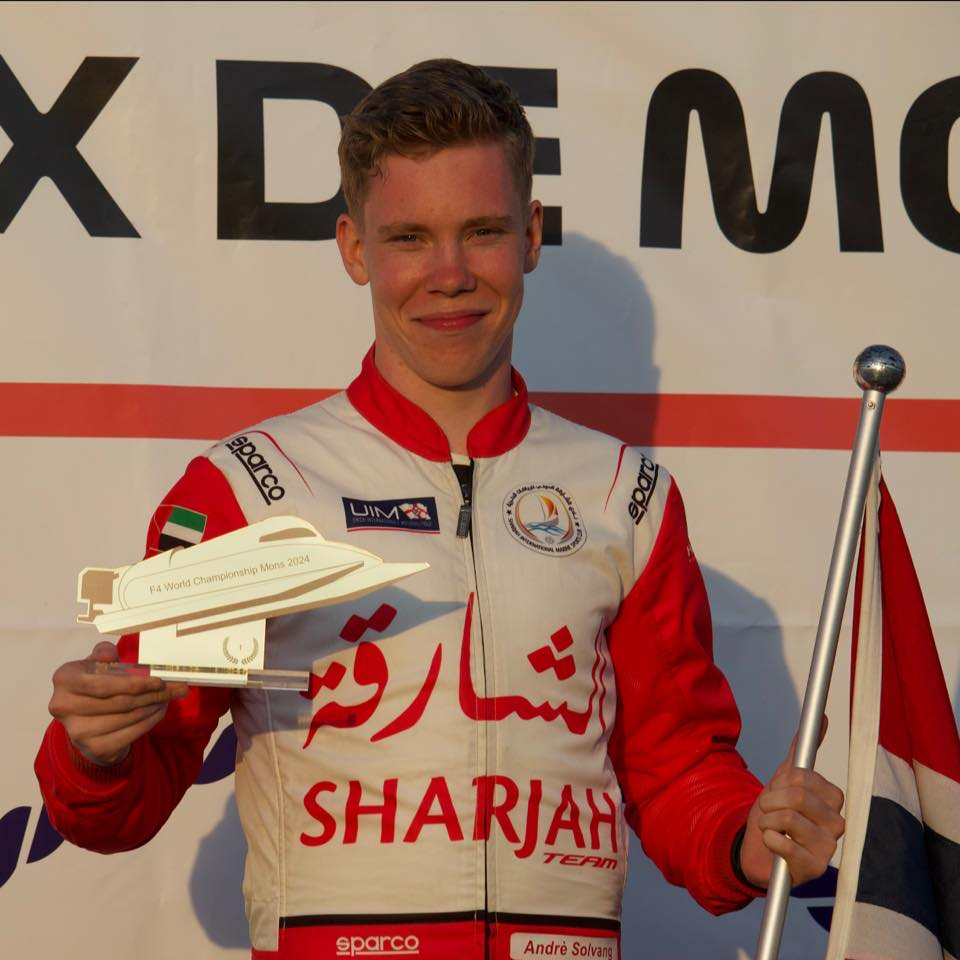
- Solvang in 2024

Personal information
- Nationality: Norwegian
- Born: 2003 (age 22–23) Drammen, Norway

Sport
- Sport: Powerboat racing
- Club: Team Sharjah (2024–present); Solvang Racing (2017–2023)

André Faye Solvang (born 2003) is a Norwegian powerboat racer from Drammen. He is a two-time UIM world champion, winning the GT30 World Championship in 2019 and the F4 World Championship in 2024. In 2024, he became the first Norwegian to win the triple crown in UIM F4, securing the World, European and Nordic championships in the same season. In 2025, he moved up to the UIM F2 World Championship and made his E1 World Championship debut in Lagos, Nigeria.

San Nazzaro accident

On 30 August 2026, Solvang was involved in a serious accident during the Emilia-Romagna Grand Prix, part of the UIM Formula 2 World Championship in Italy. The accident occurred shortly after the start of the race, with several boats colliding. The race was immediately stopped following the incident.

Solvang was seriously injured in the crash and was placed in a medically induced coma immediately after the accident due to the severity of his injuries. He was then airlifted to a hospital in Parma. He suffered multiple injuries, including torn ligaments and four fractures in his right knee, a fracture to his right arm, and two brain bleeds.

The following day, 31 August, Solvang woke up from the induced coma and was taken off mechanical ventilation. He had no memory of the accident. His condition continued to improve day by day, and he is expected to make a full recovery.

The accident resulted in the race not restarting, while the boats involved were seized by Italian authorities as part of an investigation into the incident.

== Early career ==
Solvang began racing in the GT15 class in 2017 and won the Norwegian GT15 Championship and Norwegian Cup in 2018. He progressed to the GT30 class, where in 2019 at age 16 he won the UIM GT30 World Championship in Kotka, Finland. In 2020, he competed for the GT30 European Championship, finishing as runner-up to Latvia's Laura Lakovica-Lakovica at Kupiškis, Lithuania.

== F4 career (2021–2024) ==
=== 2021–2022 ===
After concentrating on GT30, Solvang moved to the F4 class for his first full season in 2022. He competed in the German F4 Championship, winning the ADAC F4 German Championship in 2022. In the 2022 UIM F4 World Championship, he finished as runner-up to Estonia's Stefan Arand, having won the final race and finished second in the penultimate race. He also finished as runner-up in the 2022 F4 European Championship.

=== 2023 ===
In 2023, Solvang won the UIM F4 World Cup Championship in Kaunas, Lithuania, dominating the weekend with maximum points after winning both qualifying sessions and both races. He finished as vice-champion in both the 2023 F4 World Championship and European Championship. He also won a race in Offshore Class 3-C during the season.

=== 2024: Triple crown ===
In February 2024, Solvang signed with Team Sharjah, the prestigious Formula 1 powerboat team based in the United Arab Emirates. Racing under Team Sharjah's banner in the F4 series, Solvang won the 2024 UIM F4 World Championship, securing his second UIM world championship title and Team Sharjah's first in the F4 class. In the same season, he also won the UIM F4 European Championship and the UIM F4 Nordic Championship, achieving the triple crown.

== F2 career (2025–present) ==
In 2025, Solvang moved up to the UIM F2 World Championship with Team Sharjah. He races a Sharjah-built and designed boat powered by a Mercury Racing 250 APX four-stroke engine, making him one of the first drivers to use the new 4.6-litre V8 four-stroke outboard engine that is set to become the standard power unit in UIM F2. Most of his rivals, including team-mate Stefan Arand, continue to use the two-stroke Mercury Optimax.

At his debut race in Brindisi, the opening round of the 2025 championship, Solvang qualified third and finished fourth. At the Lithuania Grand Prix, he gained positions during the heat and scored points. The race at San Nazzaro was cancelled due to unsafe conditions after qualifying was completed.

== E1 Series (2025) ==
In October 2025, Solvang made his E1 World Championship debut at the Lagos Grand Prix in Nigeria, driving for Team AlUla Championed by LeBron James. He was recruited alongside Spanish racing driver Nerea Martí to replace the team's regular pilots Catie Munnings and Rusty Wyatt, who were unavailable due to prior racing commitments. Racing the all-electric RaceBird for the first time, Solvang qualified second in his group and finished third in his first race, claiming a podium finish on his E1 debut. He described the RaceBird as "one of the hardest racing boats I've ever driven" due to the precision required with throttle control and trim adjustments. In the Place Race Final for positions six through nine, Solvang finished behind Giacomo Sacchi of Team Miami.

== Personal life ==
Solvang is a qualified ship's officer and works for a cruise line company. He balances his racing career with his maritime profession, with his employer accommodating his racing schedule to allow him to compete in race weekends.

== Racing record ==
Season	Championship	Result
2025	E1 World Championship Lagos GP	3rd in race (debut)
2024	UIM F4 World Championship	Champion
2024	UIM F4 European Championship	Champion
2024	UIM F4 Nordic Championship	Champion
2023	UIM F4 World Cup Championship	Champion
2023	UIM F4 World Championship	Vice-Champion
2023	UIM F4 European Championship	Vice-Champion
2023	Offshore Class 3-C	Race Winner
2022	UIM F4 World Championship	Vice-Champion
2022	UIM F4 European Championship	Vice-Champion
2022	ADAC F4 German Championship	Champion
2019	UIM GT30 World Championship	Champion
2018	GT15 Norwegian Championship	Champion
2018	GT15 Norwegian Cup	Gold
