= Eivind Lund =

Norwegian painter (1914–1984)

Eivind Lund (May 15, 1914, in Drammen – May 27, 1984) was a Norwegian painter.

He started his education in 1935 at Kunst und Dekorationsfachschule in Hamburg, Germany, and Schule Reimann and Erno Wacklawek in Berlin.

In 1951, he went to Paris, France, and became a student of André Lhote and Académie Julian. In 1951, Lund was also accepted at Le Salon in Paris and exhibited two paintings at Société Nationale des Beaux-Arts in 1952. He exhibited four times at Høstutstillingen in Oslo. Lund had several solo shows and also took part in group shows in Norway, Sweden, Denmark and Finland. In 2010, he was selected for the exhibition Drammenskunstnere gjennom 200 år (Drammen Artists through 200 Years) at Drammens Museum. His work has been purchased by (among others) Drammen Faste Galleri, The American Embassy, Sykehuset Buskerud, Drammen Council and Drammens Tidende.

Eivind Lund held many positions in Drammens Kunstforening and served on the board from 1949 to 1967.
