= Drammen =

Drammen Municipality Drammen kommune Strømsø-Bragernes
- Municipality
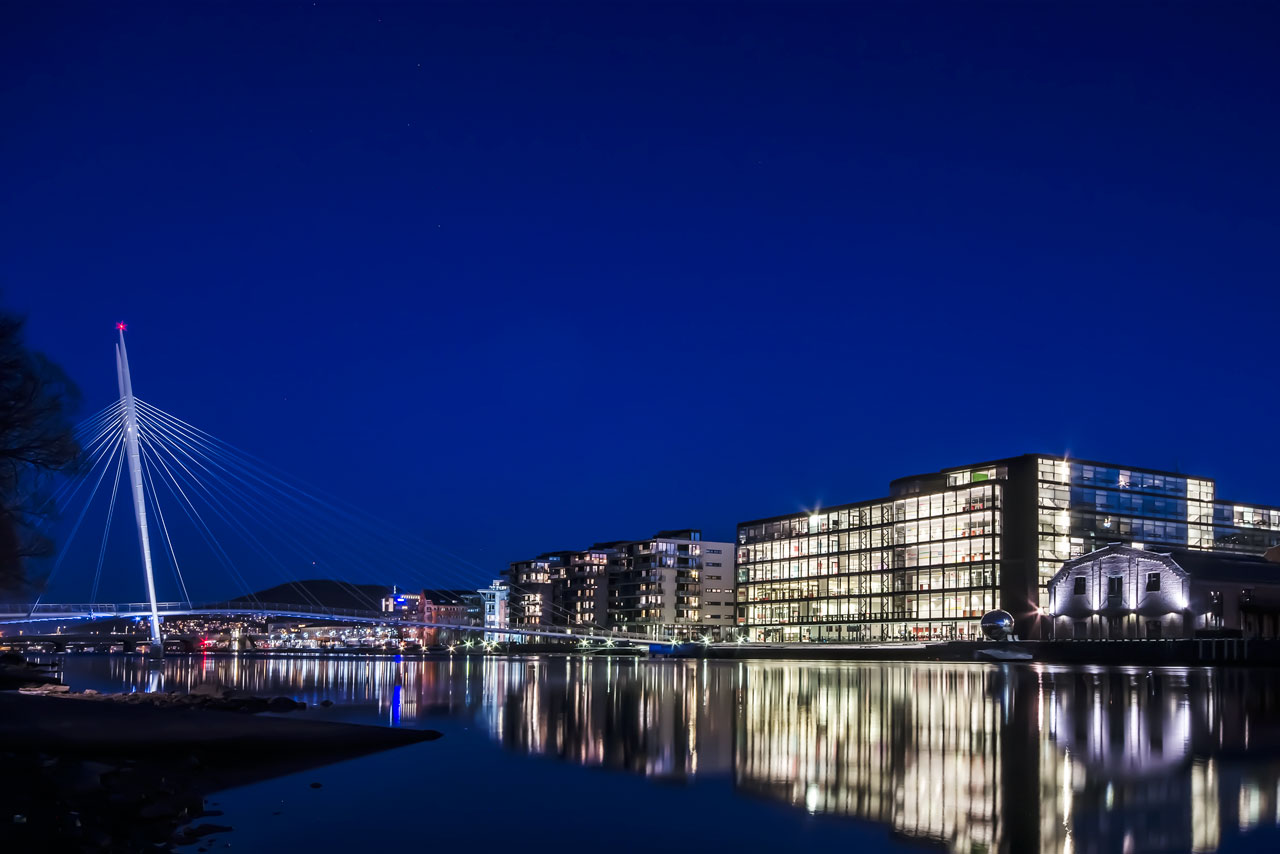
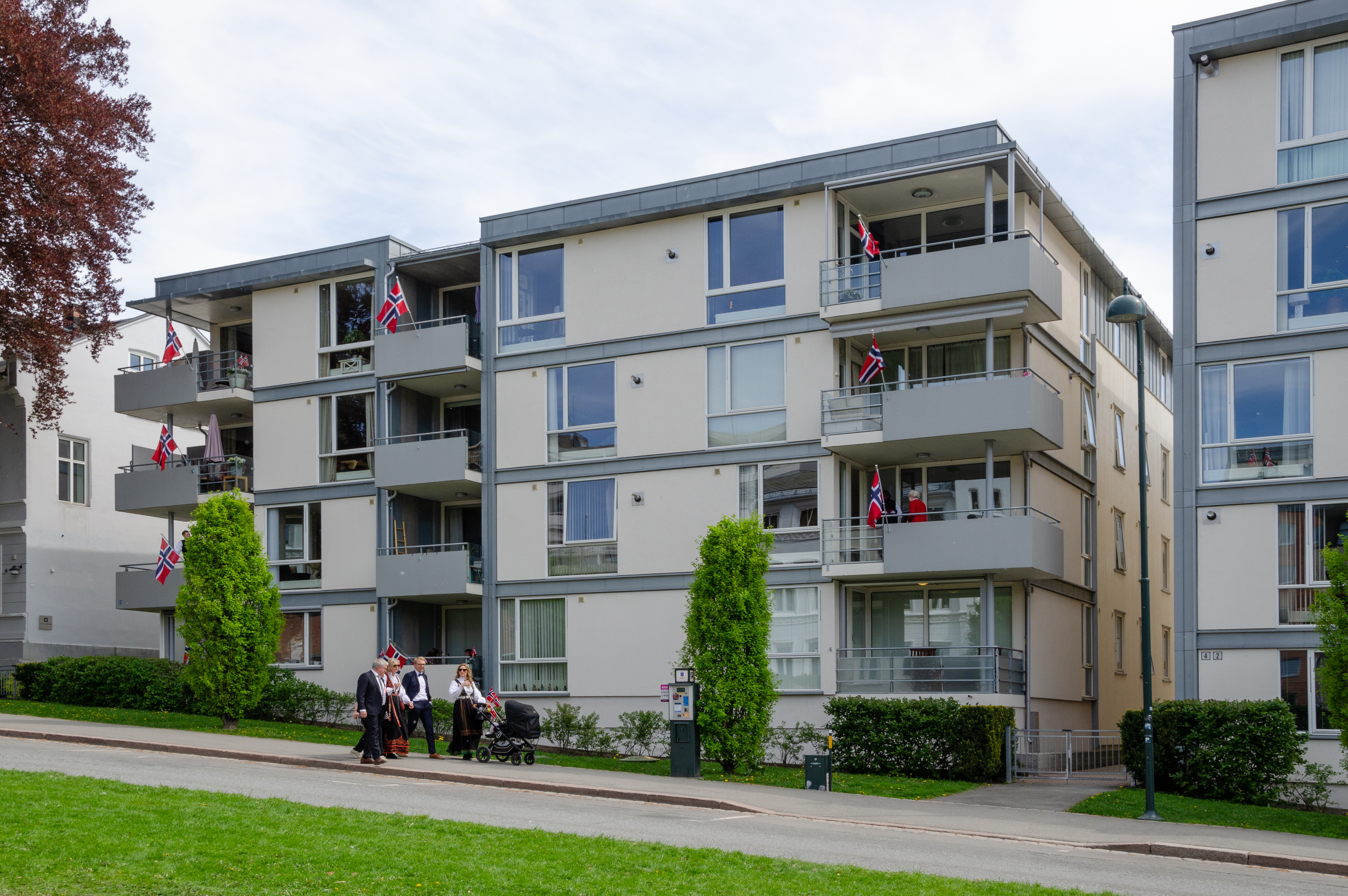
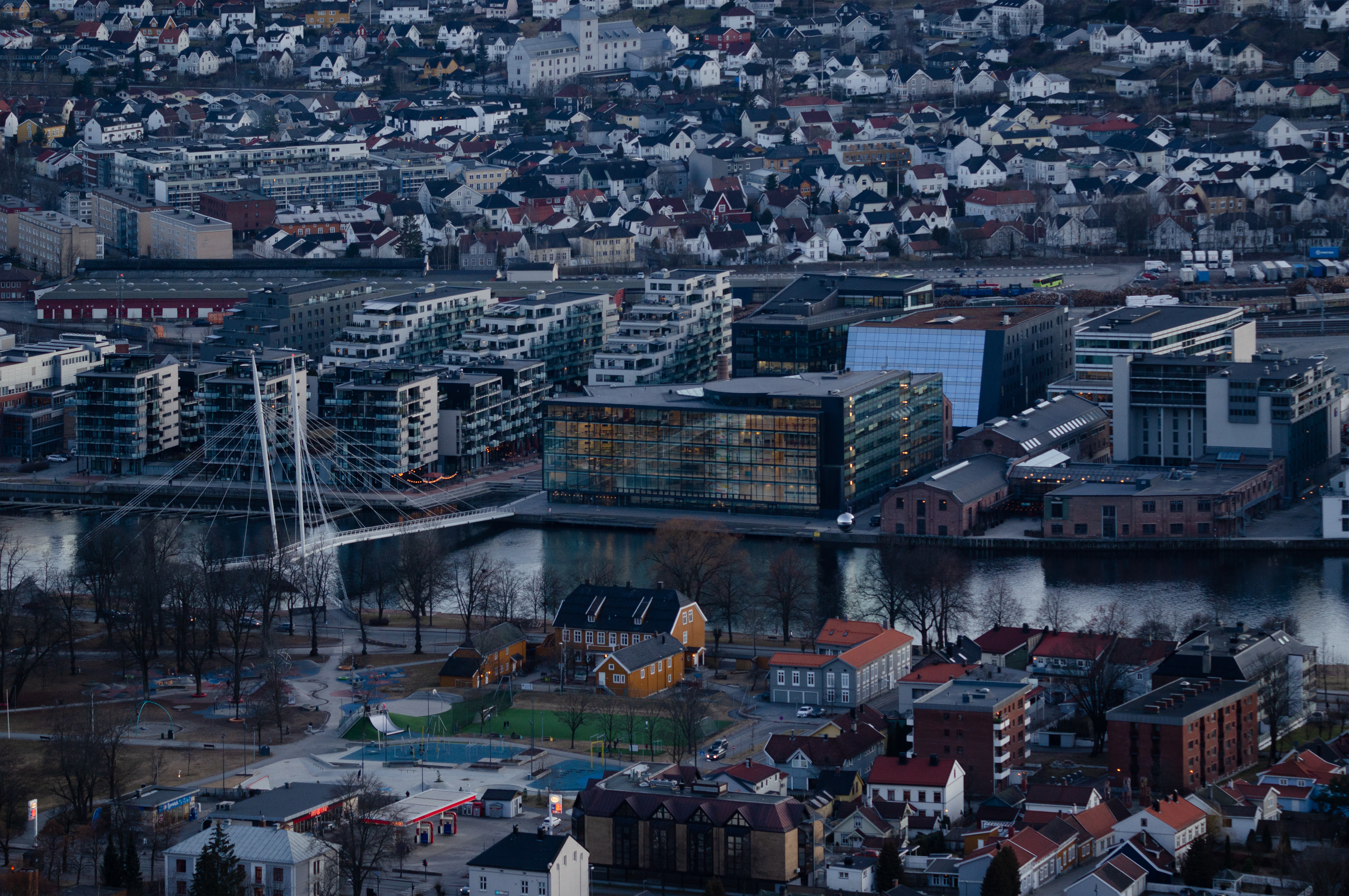
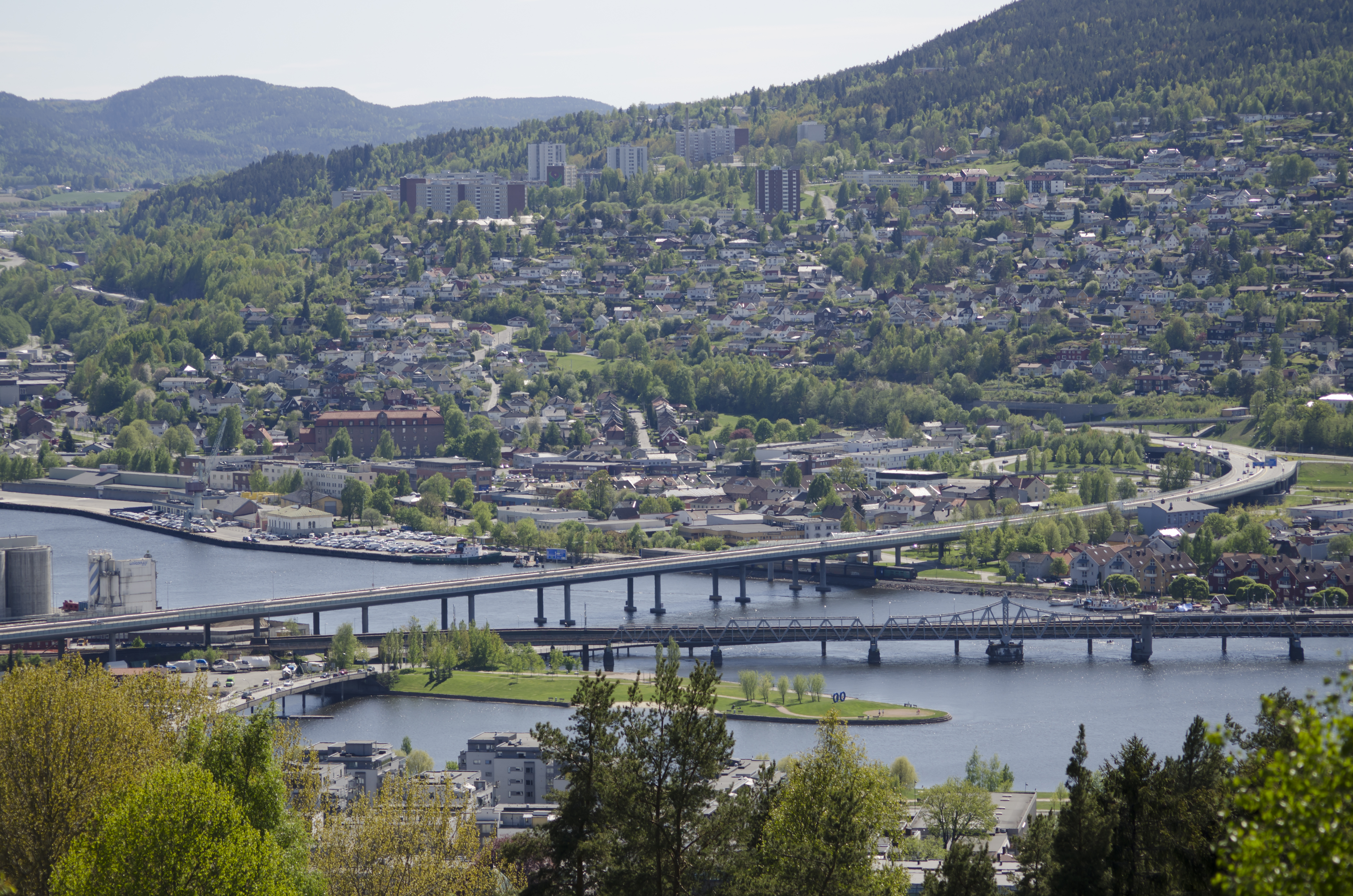

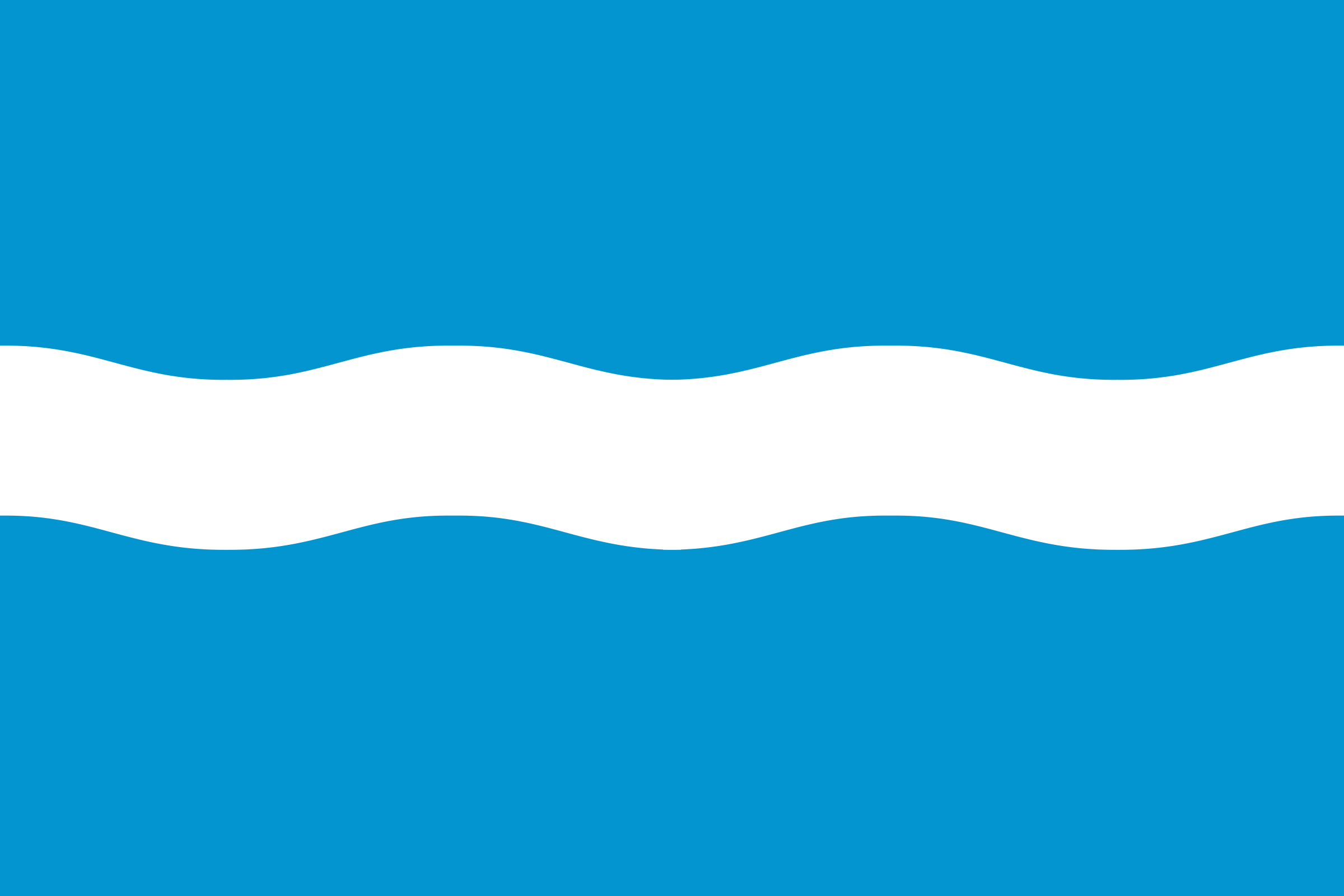
- Flag Coat of arms
- Nickname(s): Elvebyen, The River City
- Buskerud within Norway

- Drammen within Buskerud
- Coordinates: 59°44′16″N 10°12′18″E
- Country: Norway
- County: Buskerud
- Administrative centre: Drammen

Government
  - Mayor (2023): Kjell Arne Hermansen (H)

Area
  - Total: 137 km^{2} (53 sq mi)
  - Land: 135 km^{2} (52 sq mi)
  - Rank: #366 in Norway

Population (Second quarter of 2026)
  - Total: 106,368 ▲
  - Rank: #7 in Norway
  - Density: 788/km^{2} (2,040/sq mi)
  - Change (10 years): ▲ +9.7%
- Demonym: Drammenser

Official language
  - Norwegian form: Bokmål
- Time zone: UTC+01:00 (CET)
  - Summer (DST): UTC+02:00 (CEST)
- ISO 3166 code: NO-3301
- Website: Official website

Drammen (Norwegian pronunciation: [ˈdrɑ̀mːən]) is a city and municipality in Buskerud county, Norway. The port and river city of Drammen is centrally located in the south-eastern and most populated part of Norway. Drammen municipality also includes smaller towns and villages such as Konnerud, Svelvik, Mjøndalen and Skoger.

== Location ==
Drammen is located west of the Oslofjord inlet, situated approximately 44 km (27 mi) southwest of the capital city of Oslo. There are more than 100,000 inhabitants in the municipality, though the city is the regional capital of an area with around 82,000 residents. Drammen, and its adjacent communities, are experiencing more socioeconomic and population growth than ever before. The city makes good use of the Drammensfjord, a waterway utilised for recreation, fishing and other activities, as well as waterfront housing.

== Name and coat of arms ==
The Old Norse form of the city's name was Drafn, and this was originally the name of the inner part of Drammensfjord. The fjord is, however, probably named after the river Drammenselva (Norse Drǫfn), and this again is derived from drǫfn f 'wave'. The coat-of-arms is from modern times. They were granted on 17 November 1960. The arms has a silver-colored column on top a silver-colored bedrock crossed with a silver-colored key and sword against a blue background. It is based upon the old seal dating from 1723 for Bragernes, one of the central parts of Drammen. The motto for Bragernes (in Latin) was In Fide Et Justitia Fortitudo (English: in faith and justice is strength), and the items in the seal are referring to this: key = faith, sword = justice, column on rocks = strength.

== Governance ==
On 1 January 2020, the municipalities of Svelvik, Nedre Eiker and Drammen merged to form «The New Drammen Municipality». The new municipality, which is now called Drammen, is Norway's seventh largest with over 100,000 residents. The main seat of the Greater Municipality is located in the city of Drammen. Drammen city had a population of 82,875 inhabitants in 2021, but serves as a regional centre for an area that had a population of 110,236 inhabitants in 2021. The city is the country's record champion in environment and urban development prizes, having won 21 since 2003, consisting of 16 national and 5 international.

=== Districts ===
After the merger of the municipalities Drammen, Nedre Eiker and Svelvik in 2020, the municipality was then divided into ten municipal regions:

- Mjøndalen
- Krokstadelva
- Åssiden
- Gulskogen
- Konnerud
- Fjell
- Strømsø
- Bragernes
- Åskollen
- Svelvik

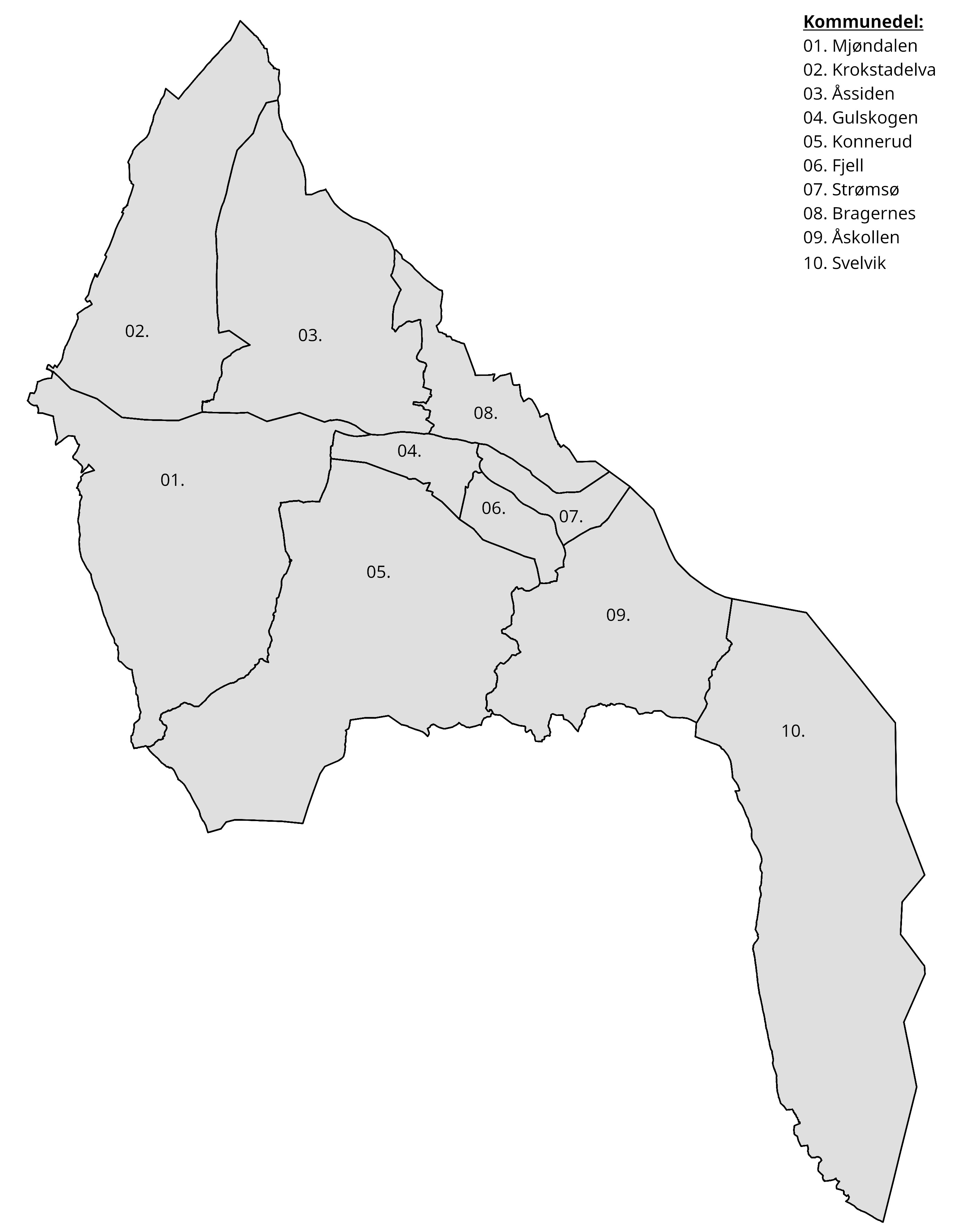
Municipal regions in Drammen

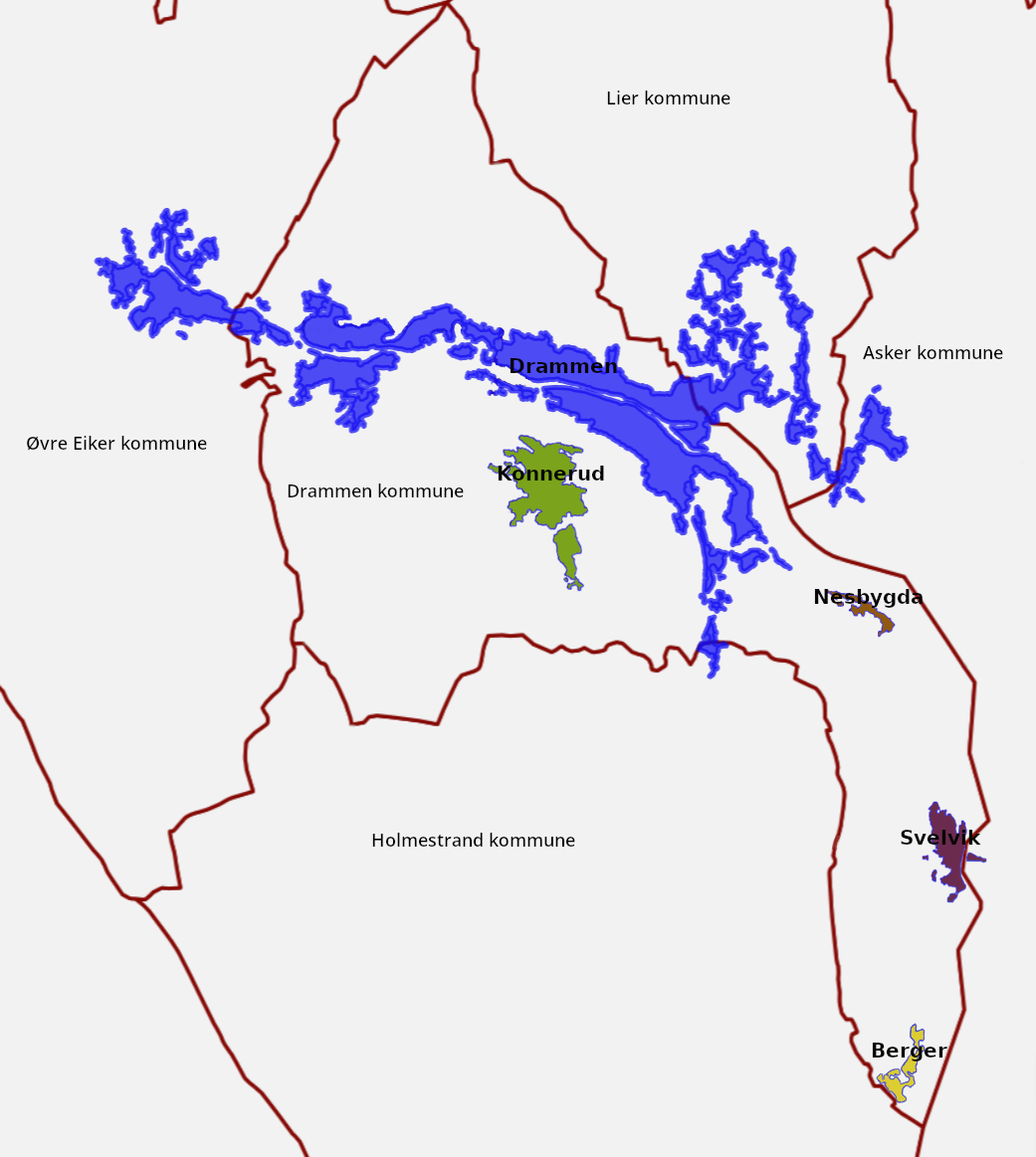
Map of the urban area of Drammen 2021

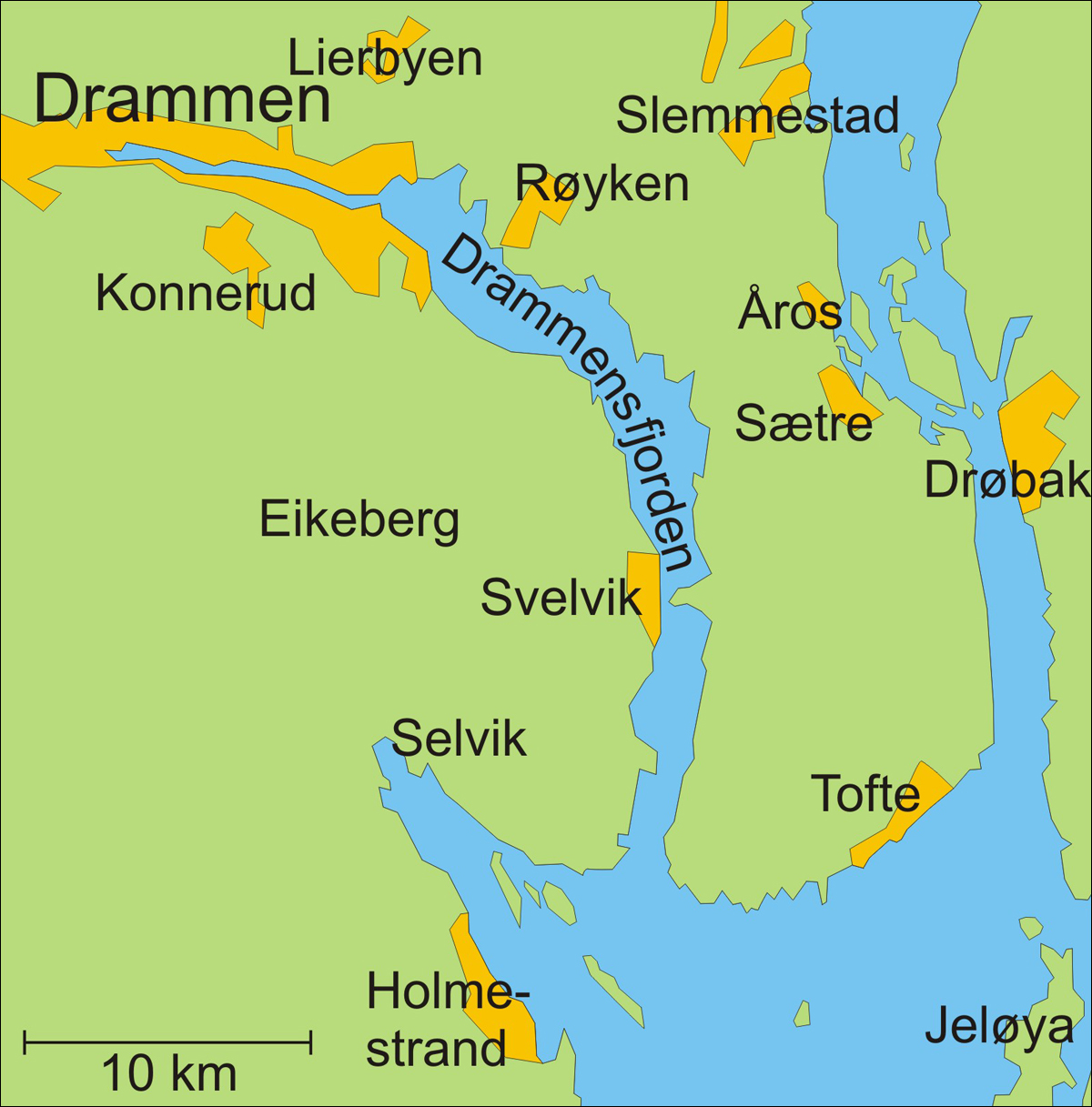
Map of Drammensfjorden

== History ==
Rock carvings at Åskollen and Austad are 6000 to 7000 years old, and are the first signs of human activity in the area. The largest rock carving at Åskollen depicts a moose.

Drammen originally consisted of three small seaports: Bragernes (on the northern side of the Drammenselva river) and Strømsø and Tangen (both on the southern side of the river). For trade purposes, small seaports were placed under market towns. Despite their geographical proximity, Bragernes was placed under Christiania and Strømsø under Tønsberg. For this reason, cooperation between the adjacent seaport towns was almost impossible.

In 1662, a merger was proposed to unite Strømsø and Bragernes to form a market town with the name Frederiksstrøm. The proposal was rejected by King Frederick III. Bragernes received limited market town rights in 1715, and merged with Strømsø to gain status as a single city on 19 June 1811.

Its geographical location made the city favorable for seafaring, shipbuilding, log driving, timber trade. During the 19th century, paper and pulp industries were developed. Large parts of the city were ruined in the great fire of 12–13 July 1866, which led to the reconstruction of the city centre, including the characteristic town square and Bragernes church. The Drammen Line (Drammenbanen ) opened in 1872 providing rail service between Drammen and Oslo.

In 1909, Drammen got the first trolleybus system in Scandinavia, the Drammen trolleybus. The lines ran until 1967. For many years the centre of Drammen suffered from heavy traffic. In 1970, Drammen Bridge with two lanes on European route E18 was built (expanded to four lanes in 2006) and in 1999 the opening of the Bragernes tunnel (Bragernestunnelen) diverted additional traffic away from the centre of the city.

In recent years, the city centre has seen the introduction of new housing, shopping facilities, restaurants, cafes and bars, as well as a public pathway along the Drammenselva river.

In 2011, Drammen observed its 200th anniversary with many citywide jubilee celebrations. Drammen's district heating system was upgraded to use water-sourced heat pumps, drawing on local fjord water, to support population growth in the city.

As of August 2026, Drammen is the fifth largest city in Norway in terms of its population; 126.230 inhabitans.

== Geography ==
Drammen is one of the larger cities in Norway, and lies about 40 kilometres (25 mi) from the capital of Norway, Oslo. The city centre lies at the end of a valley, on both sides of the Drammenselva river, and where the river meets the Drammensfjord. The Holmen island in Drammen is also the main harbor for car and fruit import in Norway. Skimtheia at 554 meters above sea level is the highest point of the Drammensmarka forest.

The Drammen region is part of the metropolitan region around Oslo and the country's fifth largest urban area, it extends far beyond the municipal boundaries; into the municipalities of Lier, Asker, Øvre Eiker and Holmestrand. The total population of the settlement is 110,236 inhabitants as of 1 January 2021.

In 2008 Drammen won the prestigious prize for the best city development in Europe.

== Climate ==
Drammen has a humid continental climate (Dfb), characterized by fairly cold winters and mild summers. Located at a sheltered location in a valley at the head of a narrow fjord branch of innermost Oslofjord, Drammen is one of the warmest cities in Scandinavia in summer. The warmest month on record was July 2018 with mean 22.3 °C (72.1 °F), average daily high 29.3 °C (84.7 °F) and 11 days with highs at or above 30 °C (86 °F). The all-time high 35 °C (95 °F) was recorded August 3, 1982, and is a tie with the national high for the month. The September record high is the national record. The all-time low −28 °C (−18 °F) was recorded in January 1987, which is the coldest month on record with mean −13.8 °C (7.2 °F) and average daily low −17.1 °C (1.2 °F). In more recent years, December 2010 was almost as cold. The average date for first overnight freeze (low below 0 °C (32 °F)) in autumn is 13 October (1981–2010 average). The Drammen-Berskog weather station has been operating since 2004. The station is located about 5 km from the city centre, which is more influenced by the maritime climate of Drammensfjorden. As a result, the city centre tends to experience slightly milder winters and somewhat cooler summers compared to the station. An earlier weather station named Drammen-Marienlyst (3 m) operated from 1966 to 2003.

Climate data for Drammen - Berskog 1991–2020 (8 m, extremes 1966–2020 includes earlier station)
Month	Jan	Feb	Mar	Apr	May	Jun	Jul	Aug	Sep	Oct	Nov	Dec	Year
Record high °C (°F)	13.8 (56.8)	14.6 (58.3)	21.7 (71.1)	24.3 (75.7)	30.5 (86.9)	34 (93)	33.8 (92.8)	35 (95)	28.6 (83.5)	23.2 (73.8)	17.4 (63.3)	14.1 (57.4)	35 (95)
Daily mean °C (°F)	−3.3 (26.1)	−2.4 (27.7)	1.3 (34.3)	6.1 (43.0)	11.2 (52.2)	15.3 (59.5)	18 (64)	16.4 (61.5)	11.9 (53.4)	5.8 (42.4)	1.7 (35.1)	−2.6 (27.3)	6.6 (43.9)
Record low °C (°F)	−28 (−18)	−26.6 (−15.9)	−21.9 (−7.4)	−8.1 (17.4)	−3 (27)	1.4 (34.5)	5.2 (41.4)	3.6 (38.5)	−2.5 (27.5)	−9.2 (15.4)	−17.2 (1.0)	−24 (−11)	−28 (−18)
Average precipitation mm (inches)	59.4 (2.34)	45.7 (1.80)	43.2 (1.70)	46.4 (1.83)	64.9 (2.56)	73.3 (2.89)	72.4 (2.85)	89.3 (3.52)	78.1 (3.07)	89.1 (3.51)	82.7 (3.26)	64.1 (2.52)	808.6 (31.85)
Source 1: eklima.no (extremes) = eklima>
Source 2: yr.no (mean, precipitaiton)

Climate data for Drammen - Berskog avg high/low 2005–2025.
Month	Jan	Feb	Mar	Apr	May	Jun	Jul	Aug	Sep	Oct	Nov	Dec	Year
Mean daily maximum °C (°F)	−0.5 (31.1)	1.2 (34.2)	6.6 (43.9)	12.4 (54.3)	17.7 (63.9)	22 (72)	23.9 (75.0)	21.9 (71.4)	17.7 (63.9)	10.8 (51.4)	5 (41)	0.4 (32.7)	11.6 (52.9)
Mean daily minimum °C (°F)	−6.6 (20.1)	−5.7 (21.7)	−2.9 (26.8)	1.2 (34.2)	6.1 (43.0)	10.6 (51.1)	13.1 (55.6)	11.7 (53.1)	8.5 (47.3)	3.5 (38.3)	−0.7 (30.7)	−5.4 (22.3)	2.8 (37.0)
Source 1: eklima.no (extremes) = eklima>
Source 2: yr.no (mean, precipitaiton)

== Demographics ==
As of 2022, Immigrants and Norwegian-born with immigrant parents in Drammen is 29 per cent, of which 25 per cent are Norwegian-born with immigrant parents.

As of 2022, immigrants of non-Western origin and their children enumerated 20,507 and made up an estimated 22% of Drammen's population. Immigrants of Western origin and their children enumerated 9,333 and made up an estimated 9% of Drammen's population.

Minorities (1st and 2nd generation) by country of origin in 2021
Ancestry	Number
Poland	3,419
Turkey	2,689
Iraq	1,662
Afghanistan	1,425
Pakistan	1,263
Lithuania	1,194
Somalia	1,101
Kosovo	1,029
India	959
Iran	923
Vietnam	908
Bosnia & Herzegovina	824
Syria	710
Eritrea	706
Sweden	663

	Persons
2022
3005 Drammen	
Immigrants and Norwegian-born to immigrant parents	
Total	29 840
Nordic countries except Norway, EU/EFTA, UK, USA, Canada, Australia, New Zealand	9 333
Europe except EU/EFTA/UK, Africa, Asia, America except USA and Canada, Oceania except Australia and New Zealand, polar regions	20 507
Immigrants	
Total	22 249
Nordic countries except Norway, EU/EFTA, UK, USA, Canada, Australia, New Zealand	8 120
Europe except EU/EFTA/UK, Africa, Asia, America except USA and Canada, Oceania except Australia and New Zealand, polar regions	14 129
Norwegian-born to immigrant parents	
Total	7 591
Nordic countries except Norway, EU/EFTA, UK, USA, Canada, Australia, New Zealand	1 213
Europe except EU/EFTA/UK, Africa, Asia, America except USA and Canada, Oceania except Australia and New Zealand, polar regions	6 378

== Attractions ==
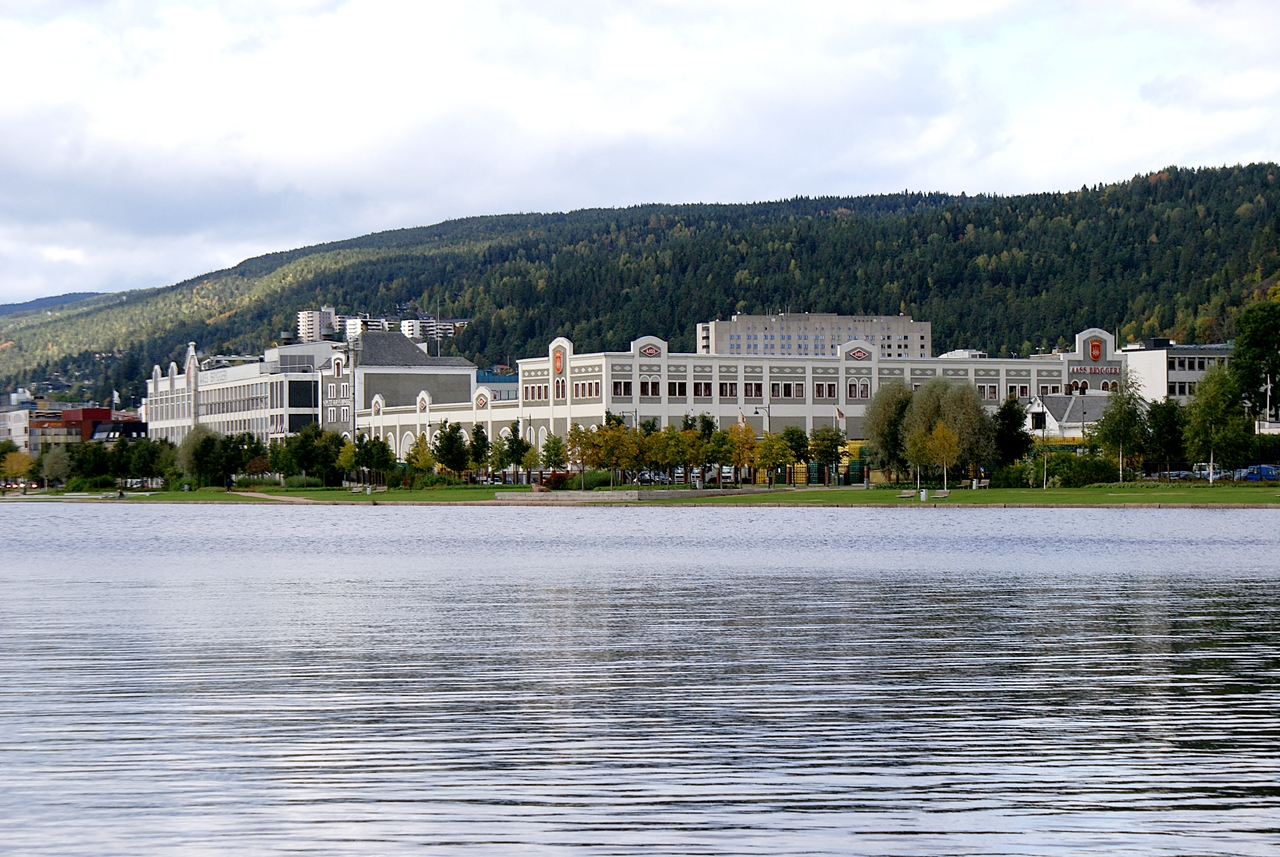
Aass Brewery

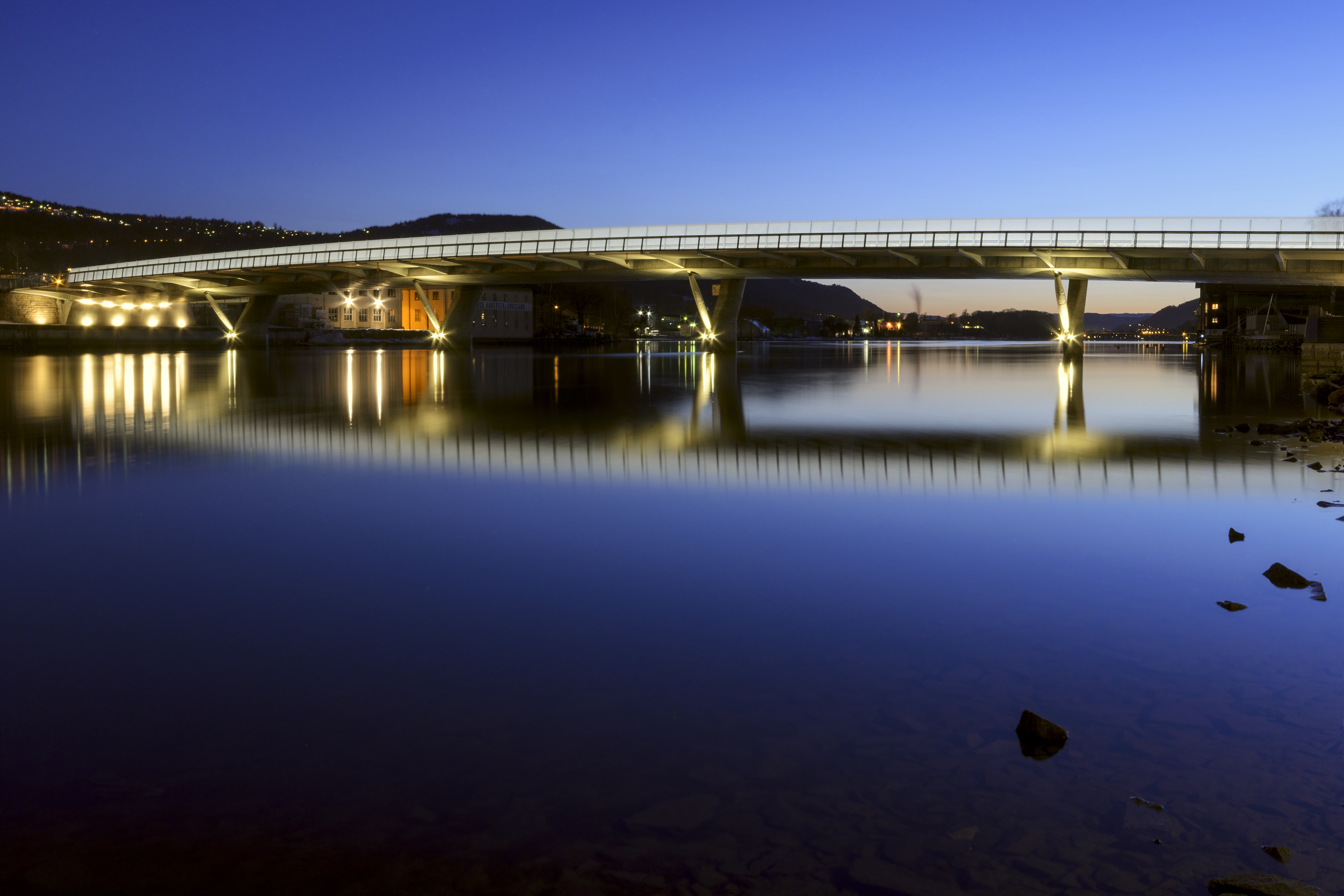
Øvre sund bridge

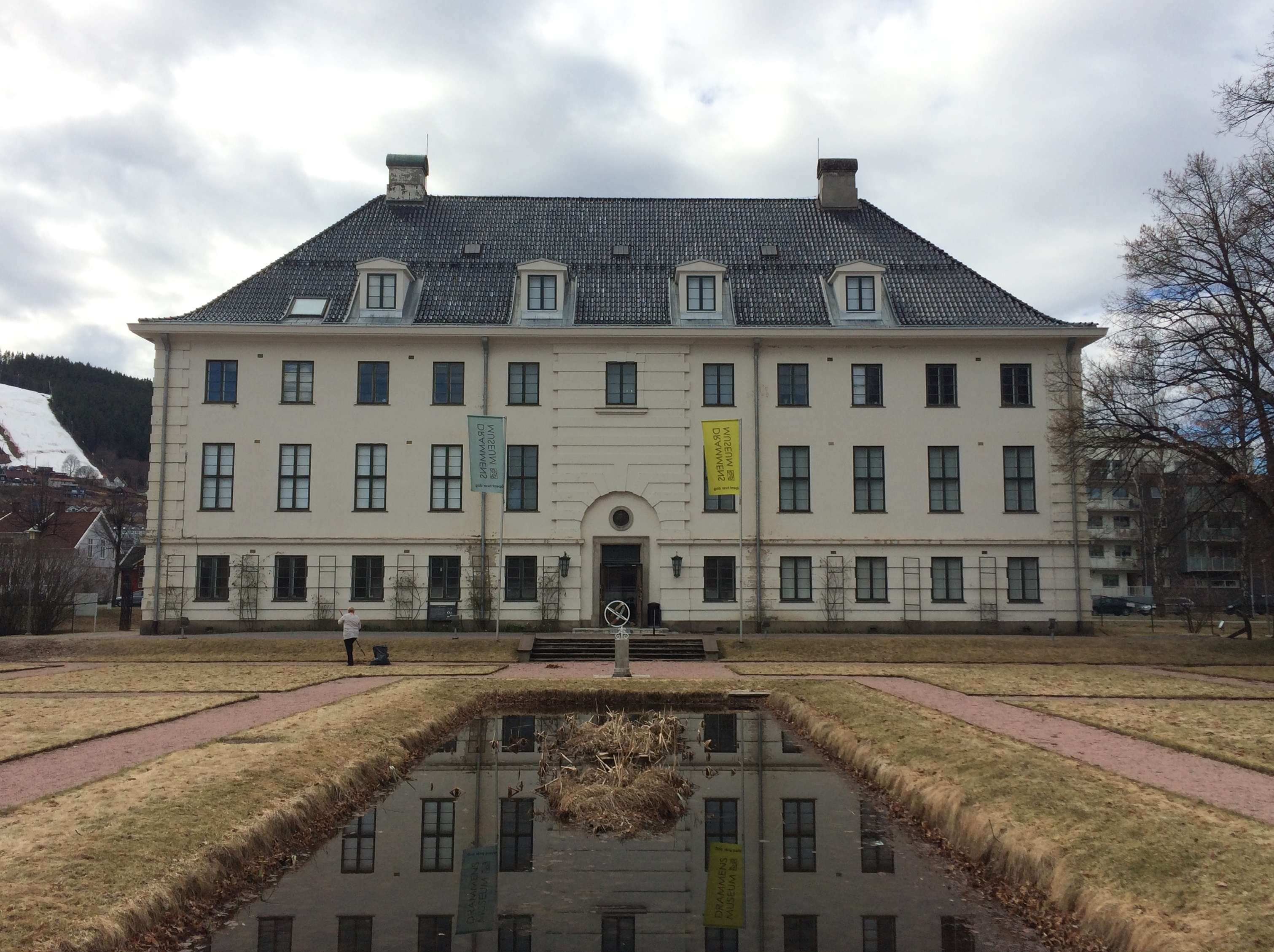
Drammens museum

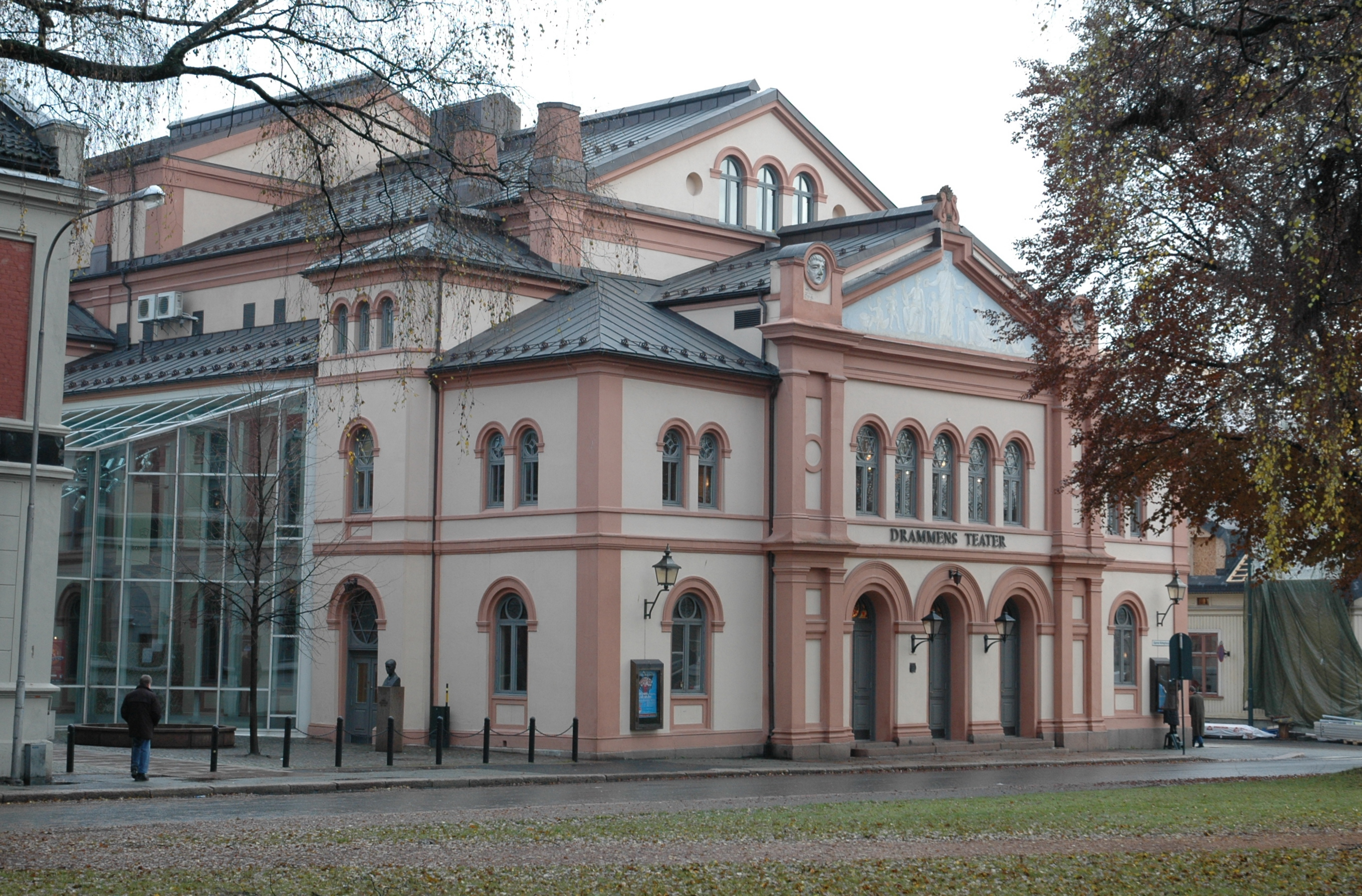
Drammen Theater

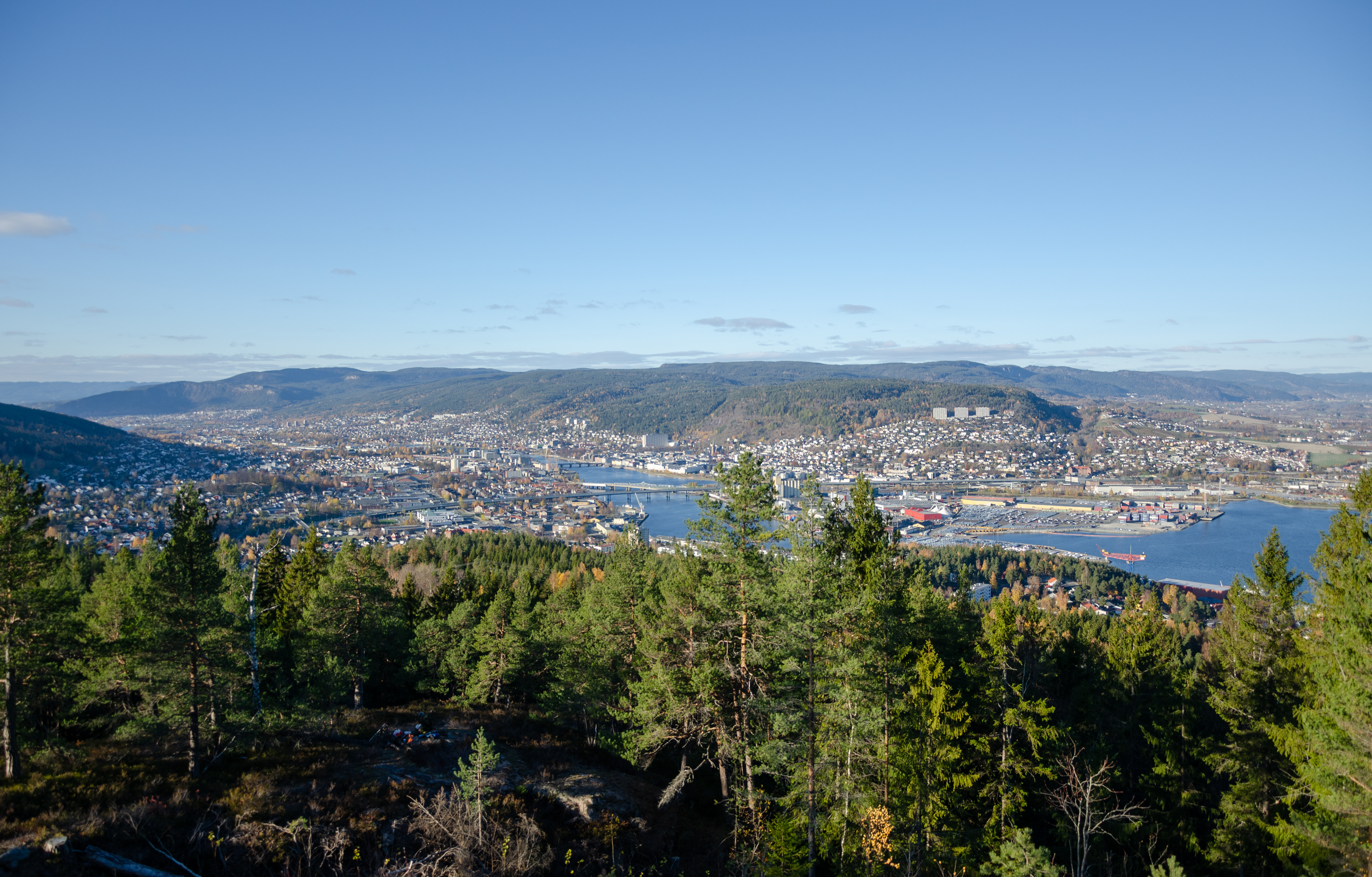
Drammen seen from Nordbykollen

=== Aass Brewery ===
Aass Brewery is the oldest surviving brewery in Norway, and has won acclaim for both its beer and its well-conserved building. Founded in 1834, the brewery's primary products are soft drinks, beer and aquavit.

=== Bridges ===
- Øvre Sund Bridge (Øvre Sund bru) – crosses Drammenselva in the center of Drammen
- Drammen City Bridge (Drammensbrua bybro) – was a concrete bridge connecting the two centers of the city, built in 1936 and demolished in 2022. A new city bridge will open in the autumn of 2025 on the same site. A temporary pedestrian bridge crosses the river adjacent to the site of the new bridge under construction.
- Drammen Bridge (Drammensbrua) – motorway box girder bridge on E18 that crosses Drammenselva, built 1971
- Ypsilon Bridge (Ypsilon bru) – cable-stayed pedestrian bridge over Drammenselva, built 2007
- Holmen bridges (Holmenbruene) – two railway bridges on the Drammen Line
- Nedre Eiker Bridge – (Nedre Eiker bru) crosses Drammenselva up the river connecting the towns Krokstadelva og Mjøndalen.
- Mjøndalsbrua – The old bridge between Mjøndalen and Krokstadelva, built for crossing of horse-drawn carriages in 1910.

=== Drammen Museum ===
The Drammen Museum of Art and Cultural History includes Marienlyst, a manor house from ca. 1770, museum building from 1930 with the museum's administration, permanent exhibitions and collections, and Lyche pavilion from 1990 with the gallery, temporary exhibitions and museum café, Halling yard, with 5 old buildings, the oldest from 1760s. The museum also includes the two largest preserved like farms in Drammen, Gulskogen Manor and Austad farm.

=== Drammen Spiral ===
The Drammen Spiral is a road tunnel that allows access to the Skansen Ridge, 180 m (591 ft) above the town. It opened in 1961 on the site of a former quarry.

=== Drammen Theater ===
Drammen Theater in Bragernes was built in 1869 and was designed by architect Emil Victor Langlet. The theater was the first modern theater in the country. It was designed in a complex Renaissance style with symmetrical facades and round arched windows. After Drammen Theater suffered total destruction by fire in December 1993, a new theater was rebuilt on the model of the original house. It was finished during February 1997.

=== Drammensbadet ===
Drammensbadet is a public swimming and training facility located in Marienlyst, Drammen. It was one of the largest in Norway when it opened 1 September 2008. They have five indoor and four outdoor pools.

=== Bragernes Torg (town square) ===
Bragernes Torg is the largest town square in Norway and one of the longest in the Nordics.

== Transport ==
The city does not have its own airport. The nearest airports are Sandefjord Airport which is located 79 km and Oslo Airport which is located 92 km away from Drammen.

== Sport clubs ==
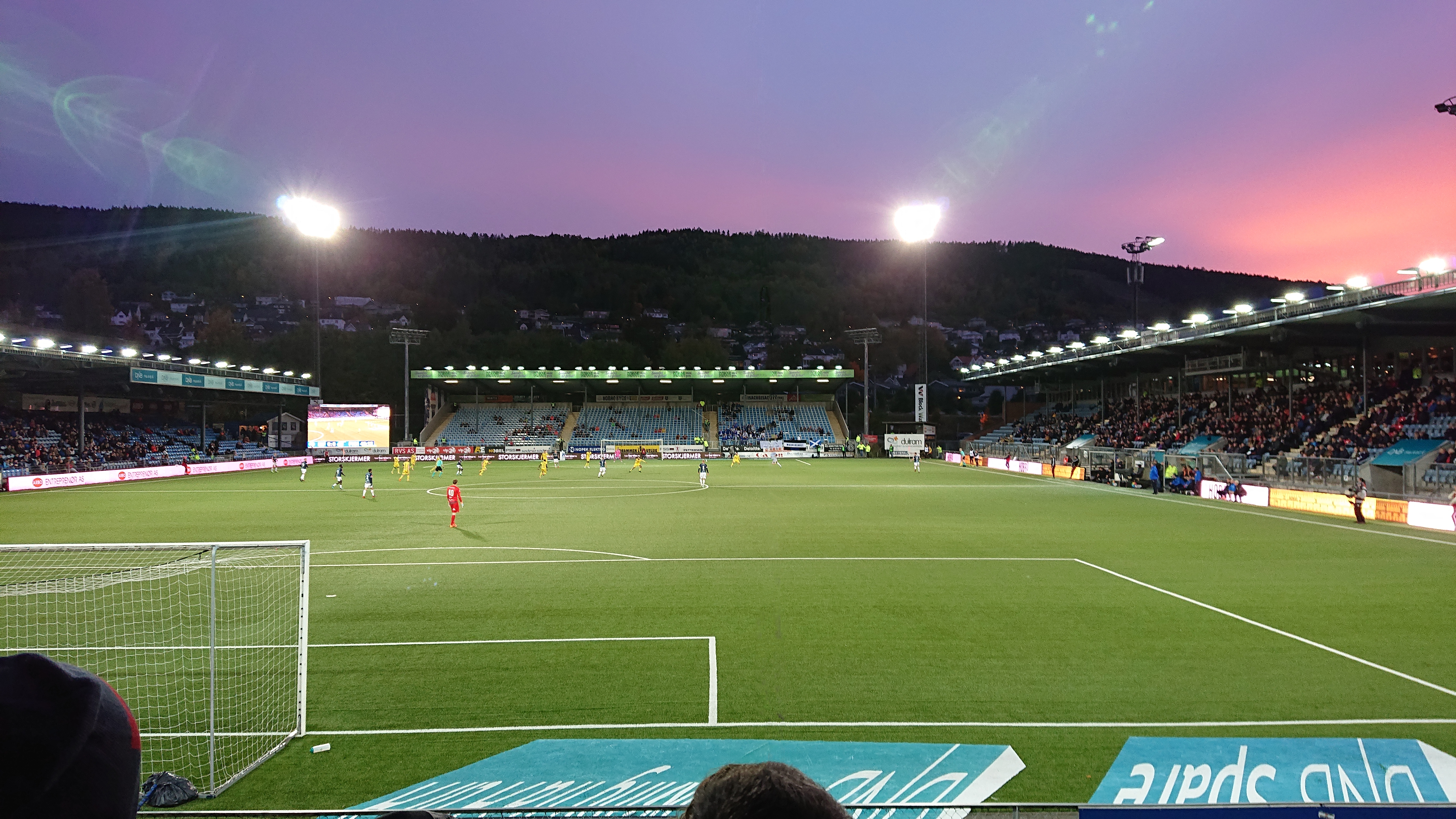
The stadium to Strømsgodset Toppfotball

- Strømsgodset IF and their elite football section Strømsgodset Toppfotball. Founded 10 February 1907. Five Norwegian Cups in football (1969, 1970, 1973, 1991, 2010). Winner of the Norwegian football league in 1970 and 2013. Won six Norwegian championships in bandy.
- Drammen golfklubb. Founded in 1988. Golf club with 18-hole course situated in the southern part of Drammen, on the border to Sande in Vestfold.
- Drammen HK Handball who has won several Norwegian Championships
- IF Hellas
- IF Sturla
- Konnerud IL Sport club most famous for its cross-country skiing facilities.
- SBK Drafn Founded 15 September 1910, 21 Norwegian Championships in bandy, 1 lost cup final in football (1927). One World Champion ski jumper, Hans Bjørnstad 1950. Ole Olympic Gold medallist, Thorleif Haug 1924 (three gold, one bronze).
- SBK Skiold
- Drammen Bandy plays in the highest division.
- Drammen FK. Founded 23 August 2008.

== Notable residents ==
=== Public service & business ===
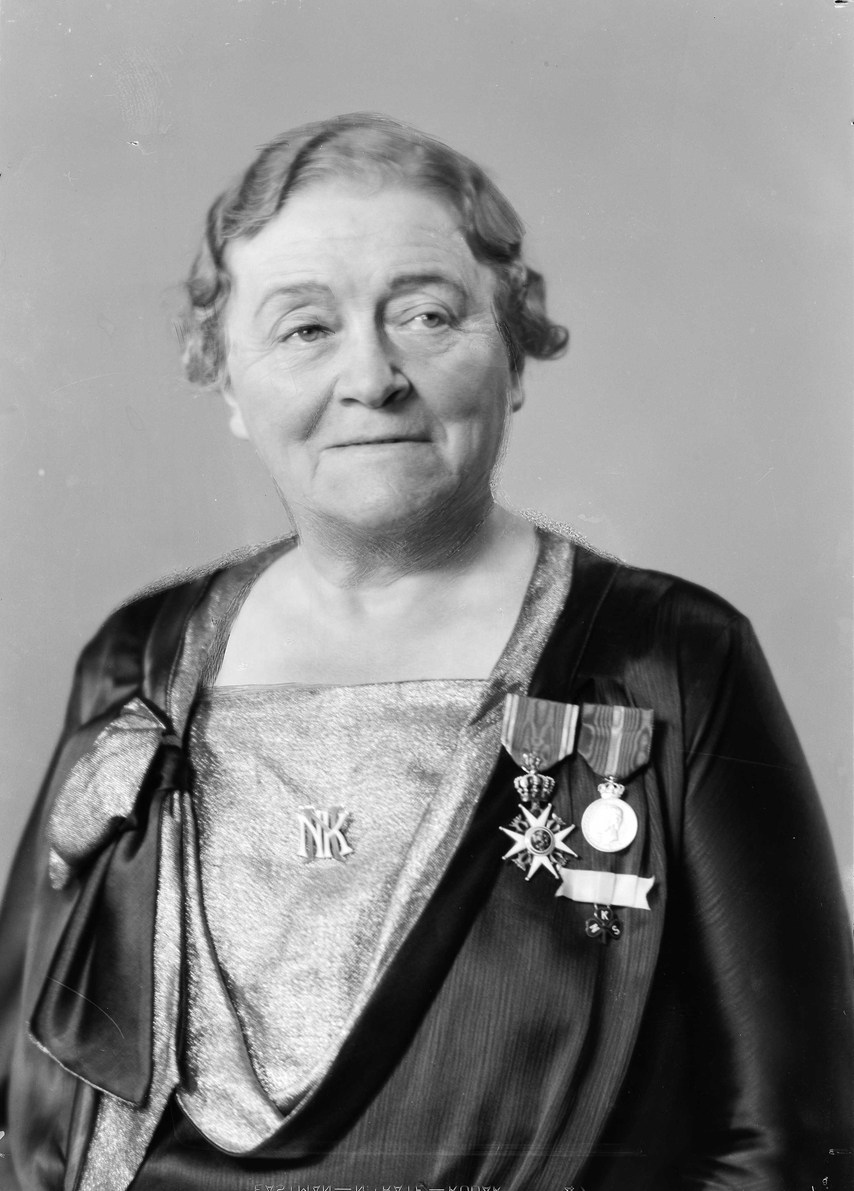
Betzy Kjelsberg, 1935

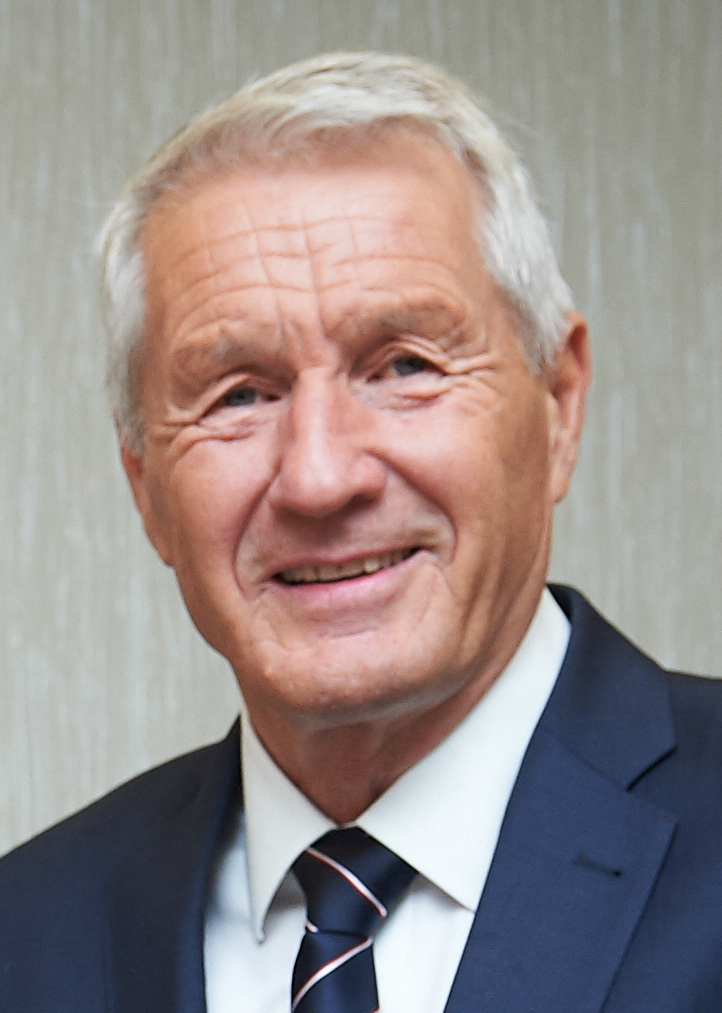
Thorbjørn Jagland, 2016

- Niels Treschow (1751 in Strømsø – 1833) a philosopher, educator and politician
- Christine Marie von Cappelen (1766 in Drammen – 1849) botanist
- Jørgen Herman Vogt (1784 in Bragernes – 1862) First Minister of Norway, 1856 to 1858
- Christen Smith (1785 in Skoger – 1816 at Congo River) physician, economist and botanist
- Erik Børresen (1785 in Bragernes – 1860) owned the first Norwegian ships to sail to China
- Bent Salvesen (1787–1820) a ship's captain and privateer; sailed from Drammen
- Bernhard Pauss (born 1839 at Tangen – 1907) theologian, educator, author and humanitarian
- Henriette Wulfsberg (born 1843 in Drammen – 1906), school owner and writer
- Gustav Jensen (1845 in Drammen – 1922) priest, hymnwriter, seminary instructor and liturgist
- Anthon B. Nilsen (1855 in Svelvik – 1936) businessman, politician and author
- Urban Jacob Rasmus Børresen (1857 in Drammen – 1943) a rear admiral and industrialist
- Betzy Kjelsberg (1866 in Svelvik – 1950) politician, women's rights activist and suffragist
- Johan Aschehoug Kiær (1869 in Drammen – 1931) a paleontologist and geologist
- Johan Berger Mathiesen (born 1872 in Drammen – 1923) surgeon, worked in Eau Claire, WI
- Arnold Maria Hansson (born 1889 in Drammen – 1981) New Zealand forestry administrator and consultant
- Konrad Knudsen (1890 in Drammen – 1959) painter and journalist, host to Leon Trotsky 1935/6
- Henning Bødtker (1891 in Svelvik – 1975) lawyer, Attorney General of Norway, 1945 to 1962
- Odd Dahl (1898 in Drammen – 1994) engineer, nuclear physics researcher and explorer
- Arnfinn Vik (1901 in Drammen – 1990) politician. Mayor of Oslo, 1945 to 1947
- Henry Wilhelm Kristiansen (1902 in Drammen – 1942) politician, chairman of the Communist Party of Norway 1931–1934
- Asbjørn Bryhn (1906 in Drammen – 1990) head of the Norwegian Police Security Service
- Thorstein Treholt (1911 in Skoger – 1993) politician and father of convicted spy Arne Treholt
- Lars Korvald (1916 in Mjøndalen – 2006) politician, Prime Minister of Norway 1972 to 1973
- Astrid Bjellebø Bayegan (born 1943) first female dean in Norway, at Drammen since 1989
- Svein Rennemo (born 1947 in Drammen) a businessperson and chair of Statoil
- Thorbjørn Jagland (born 1950 in Drammen) Prime Minister of Norway, 1996 to 1997
- Per-Erik Burud (1962 in Drammen – 2011) Norwegian billionaire, head of grocery chain Kiwi

=== The Arts ===
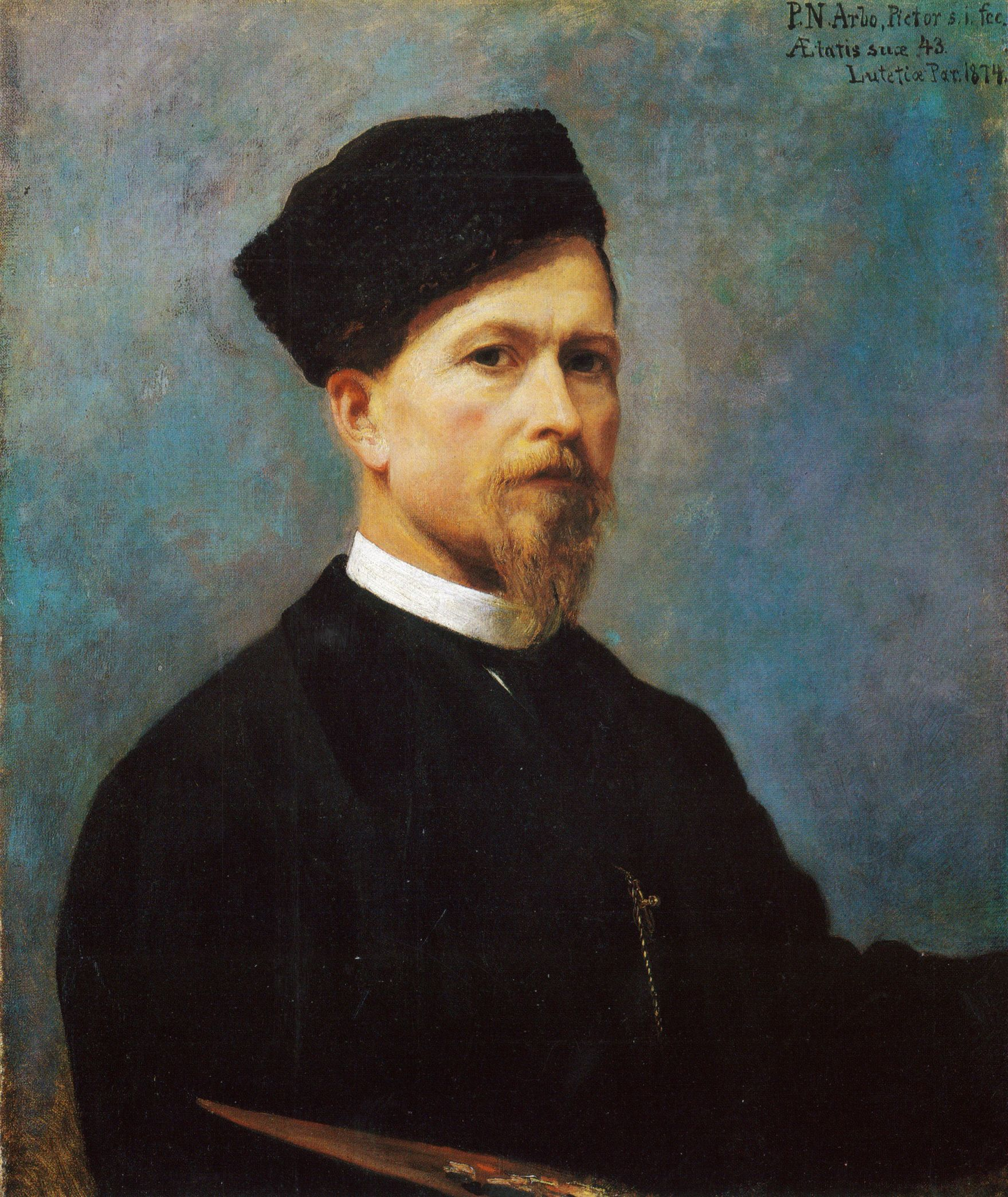
Peter Nicolai Arbo, 1874

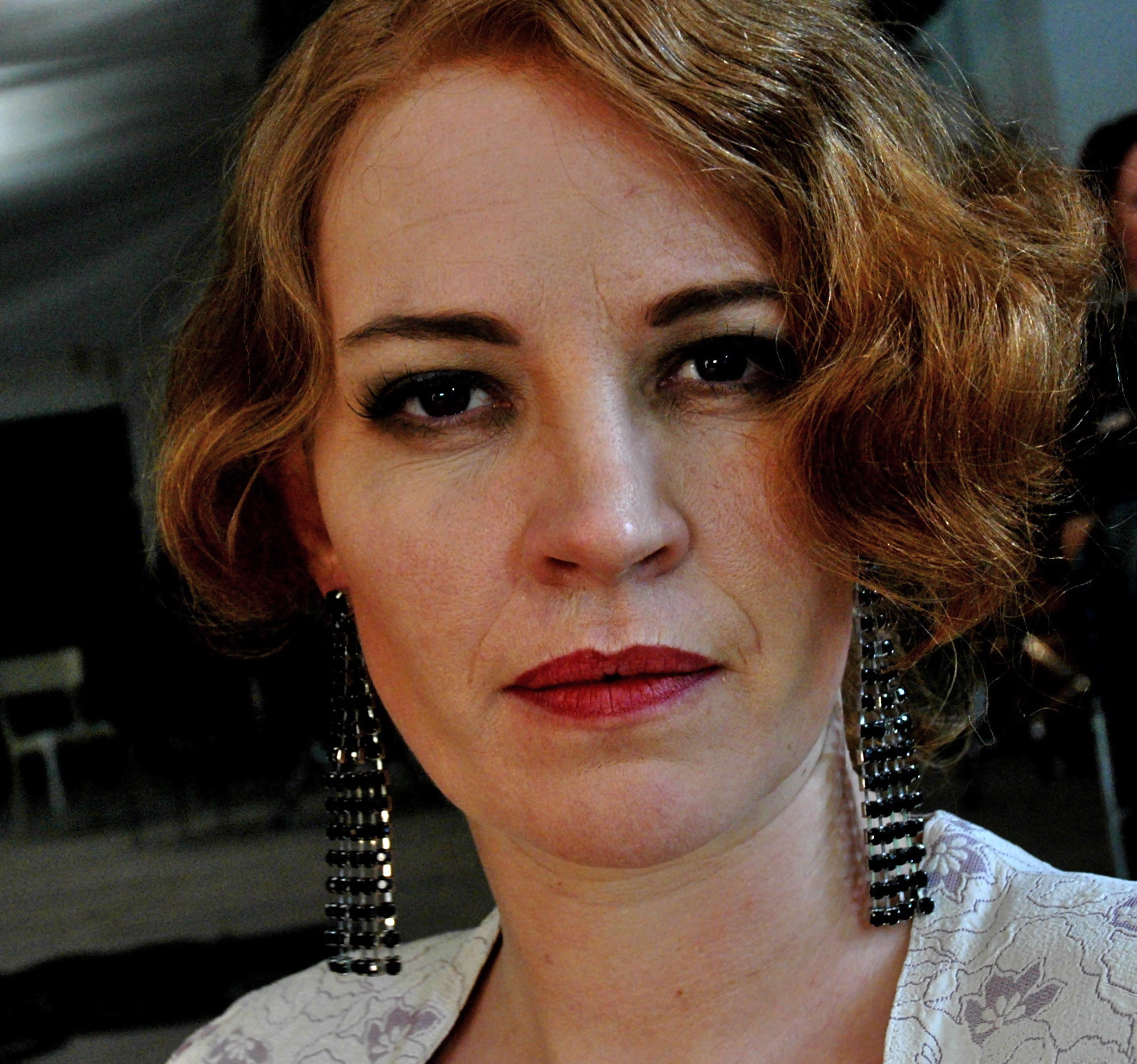
Katharina Nuttall, 2010

- Hanna Winsnes (1789 in Bragernes – 1872) a poet, novelist and cookbook writer
- Martinus Rørbye (1803 in Drammen – 1848) a Danish Golden Age painter, worked in Skagen
- Peter Nicolai Arbo (1831 in Drammen – 1892) painter of history motifs and Norse mythology
- Christian Cappelen (1845 in Drammen – 1916) a Norwegian organist and composer
- Hans Heyerdahl (1857–1913) realist painter, portraits and landscapes; grew up in Drammen
- Johan Halvorsen (1864 in Drammen – 1935) a Norwegian composer, conductor and violinist
- Barbra Ring (1870 in Drammen – 1955) novelist, short story writer and theatre critic
- Herman Wildenvey (1885 at Mjøndalen – 1959) a distinguished Norwegian poet
- Lalla Carlsen (1889 in Svelvik – 1967) a Norwegian singer and actress
- Kai Fjell (1907 in Skoger – 1989) painter, printmaker and scenographer
- Jens Gunderssen (1912 in Drammen – 1969) singer, songwriter, actor and theatre director
- Eivind Lund (1914 in Drammen – 1984) a Norwegian painter
- Solveig Christov (1918 in Drammen – 1984) writer of short stories, novels and plays
- Sverre Holm (1931 in Drammen – 2005) a Norwegian stage and film actor
- Triztán Vindtorn (1942 in Drammen – 2009) a poet and performance artist
- Lars Klevstrand (born 1949 in Drammen) a singer, guitarist, composer and actor
- Herodes Falsk (born 1954 in Drammen) comedian, actor, author, and songwriter
- Katharina Nuttall (born 1972 in Drammen) an artist, film composer and music producer
- Todd Terje (born 1981 in Mjøndalen) a Norwegian DJ, songwriter, and record producer

=== Sport ===
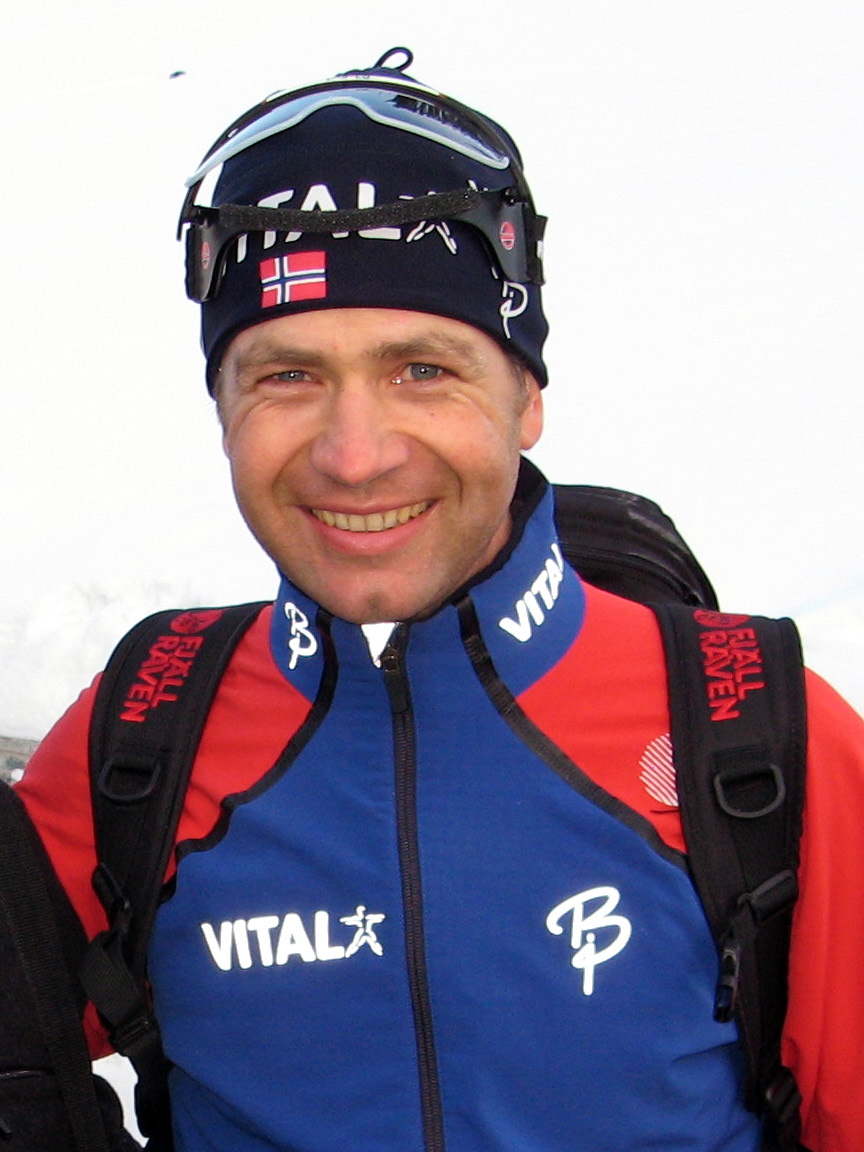
Ole Einar Bjoerndalen, 2007

- Thorleif Haug (1894 in Lier – 1934) three Nordic skiing gold medals at 1924 Winter Olympics
- Charles Mathiesen (1911 in Drammen – 1994) speed skater gold medal 1936 Winter Olympics
- Johan Haanes (1912 in Drammen – 2000) tennis player, ski jumper and track and field athlete
- Finn Helgesen (1919 in Drammen – 2011) speed skater, gold medalist 1948 Winter Olympics
- Arne Bergodd (born 1948 in Drammen) rower, team silver medallist at 1976 Summer Olympics
- Arne Dokken (born 1955 in Drammen) footballer with 190 club caps and 24 for Norway
- Svend Karlsen (born 1967 in Drammen) former strongman, powerlifter and bodybuilder
- Johann Olav Koss (born 1968 in Drammen) speed skater with four Olympic gold medals
- Glenn Solberg (born 1972 in Drammen) handball coach, former player, 122 caps for Norway
- Heidi Tjugum (born 1973 in Drammen) team handballer, twice Olympic team medallist
- Ole Einar Bjørndalen (born 1974 in Drammen) retired biathlete, 13 Winter Olympics medals
- Adnan Haidar (born 1989 in Drammen) footballer with over 150 club caps and 36 for Lebanon
- Martin Ødegaard (born 1998) footballer with 300+ club appearances, captain of Norway and the captain of Arsenal
- Kristian Krogh Johannessen (born 1995) Professional golfer, qualified to represent Norway at the 2021 Olympics.
- Andrè Faye Solvang (2003 in Drammen – Present) Powerboat racer 2019 UIM GT30 World Champion, 2024 UIM F4 World Champion.

== Twin towns – sister cities ==
Drammen is twinned with:

- Kolding, Denmark
- Lappeenranta, Finland
- Örebro, Sweden
- Stykkishólmur, Iceland

== Gallery ==
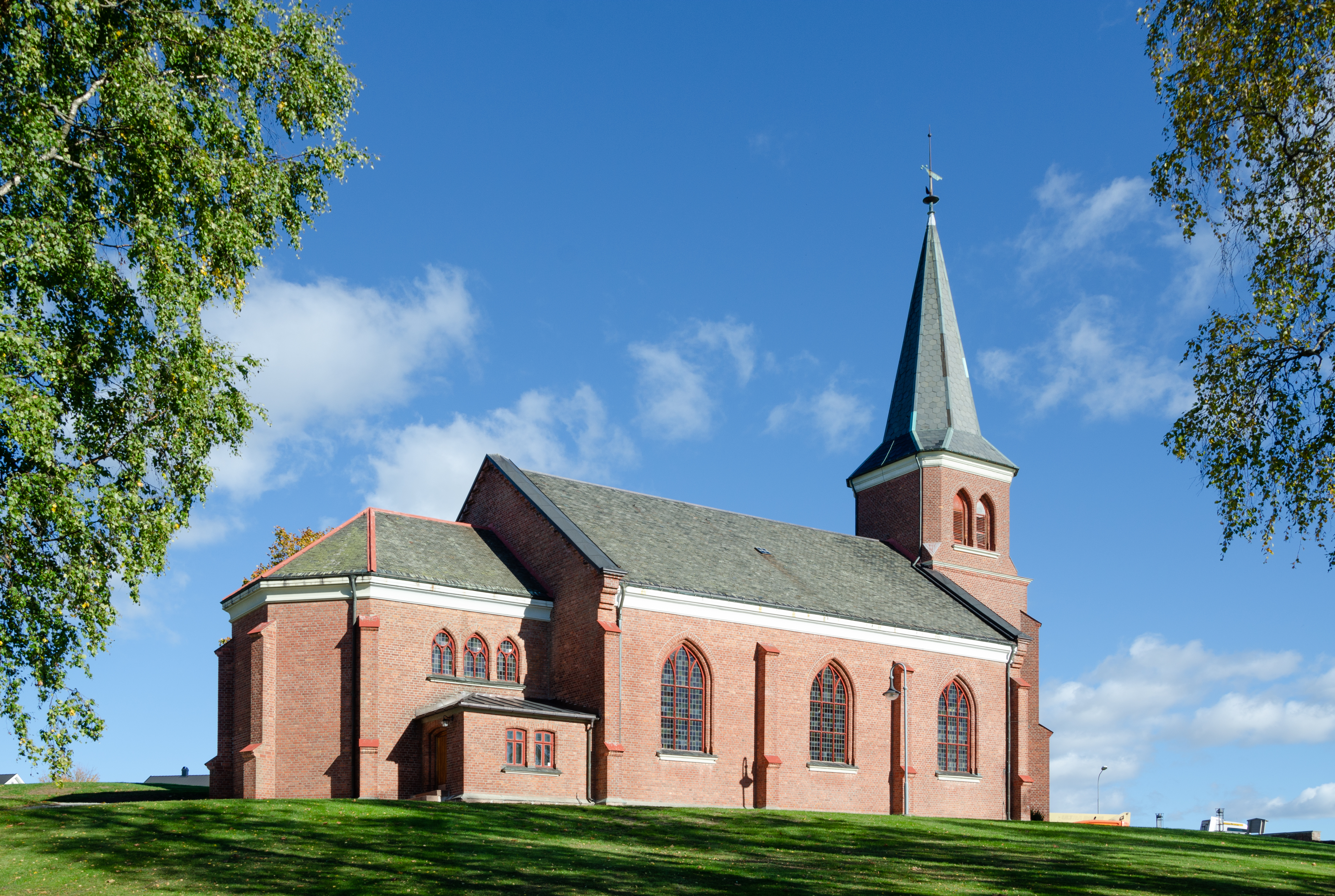
Skoger Church

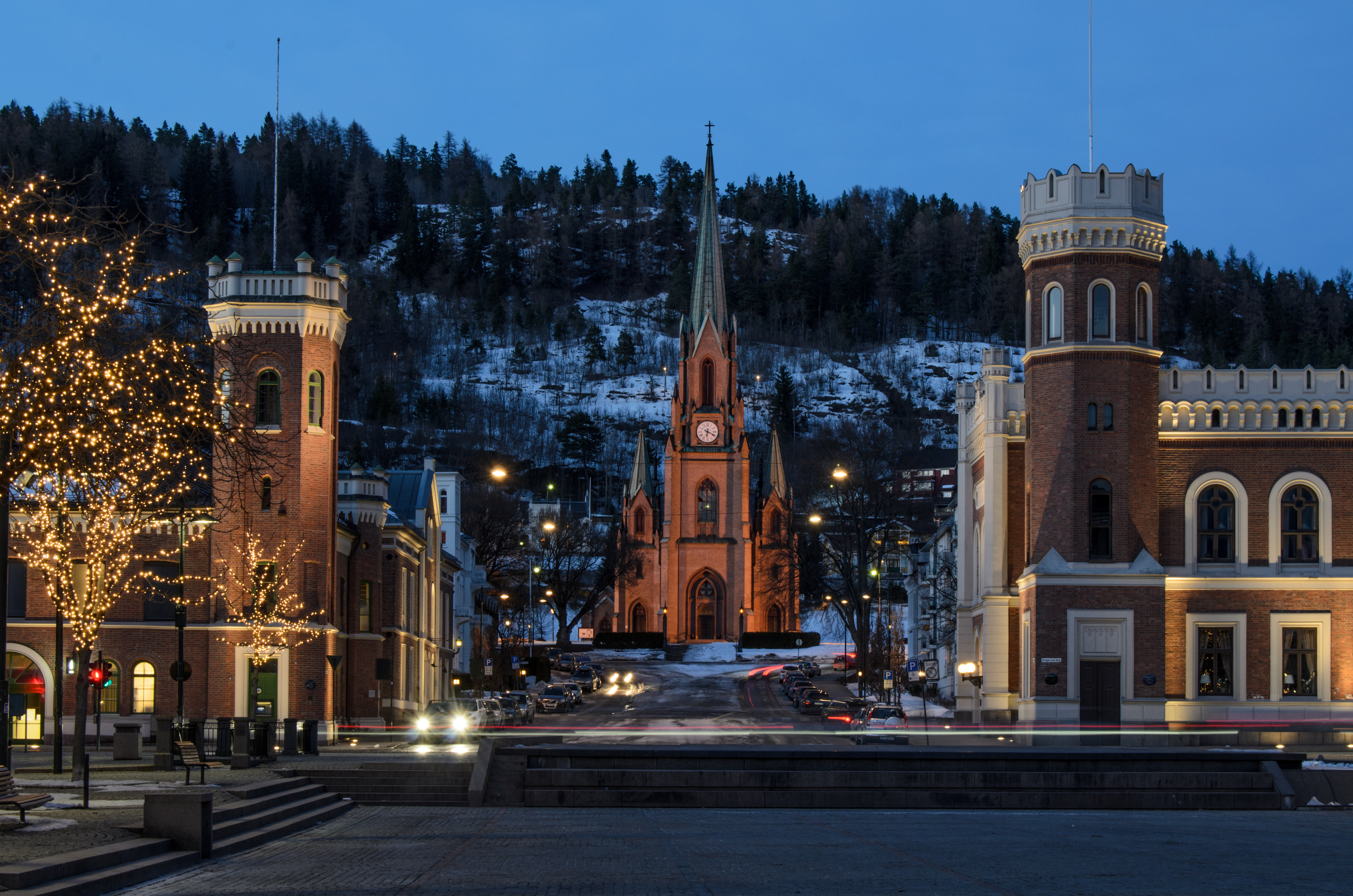
Bragernes Church

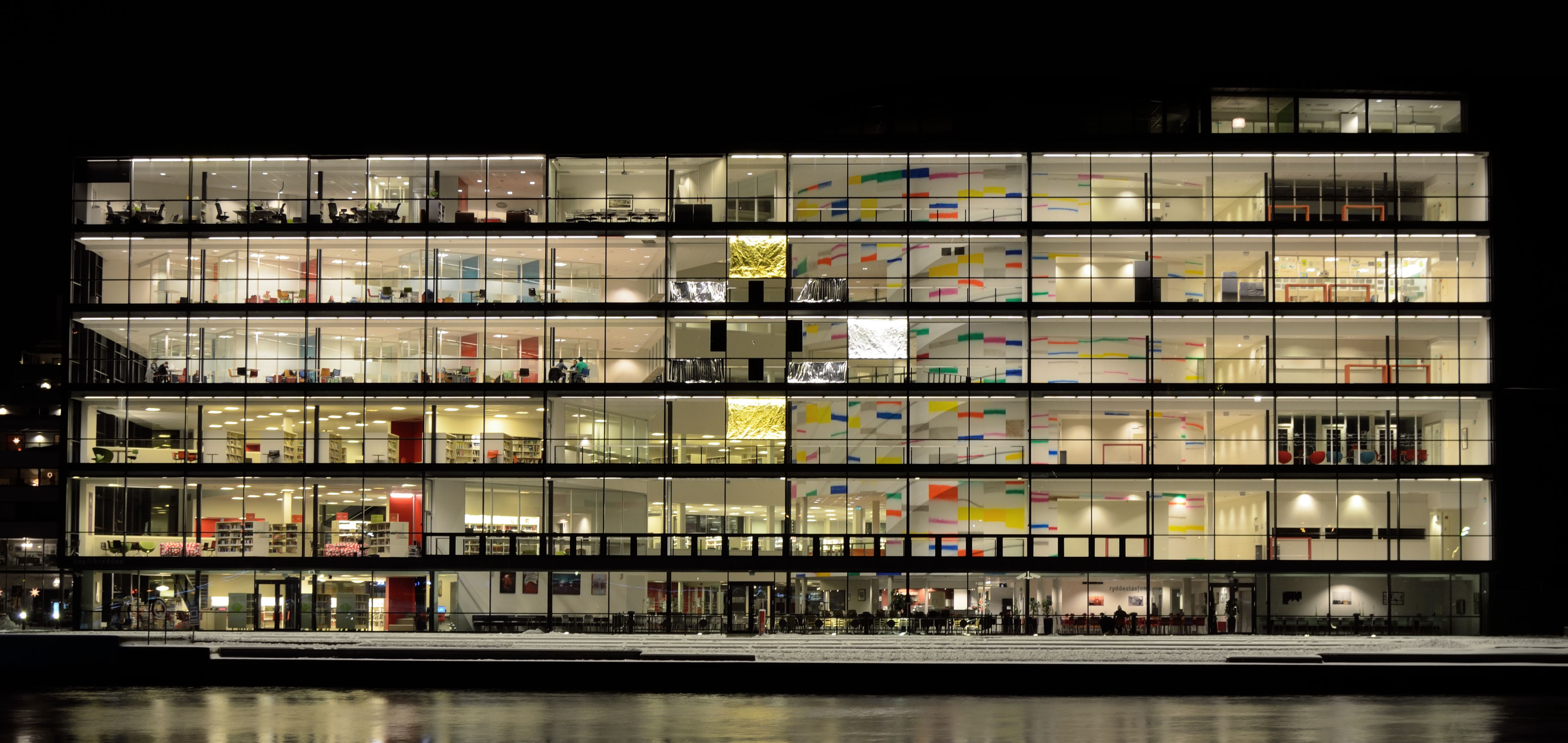
Nightscape of University and public library

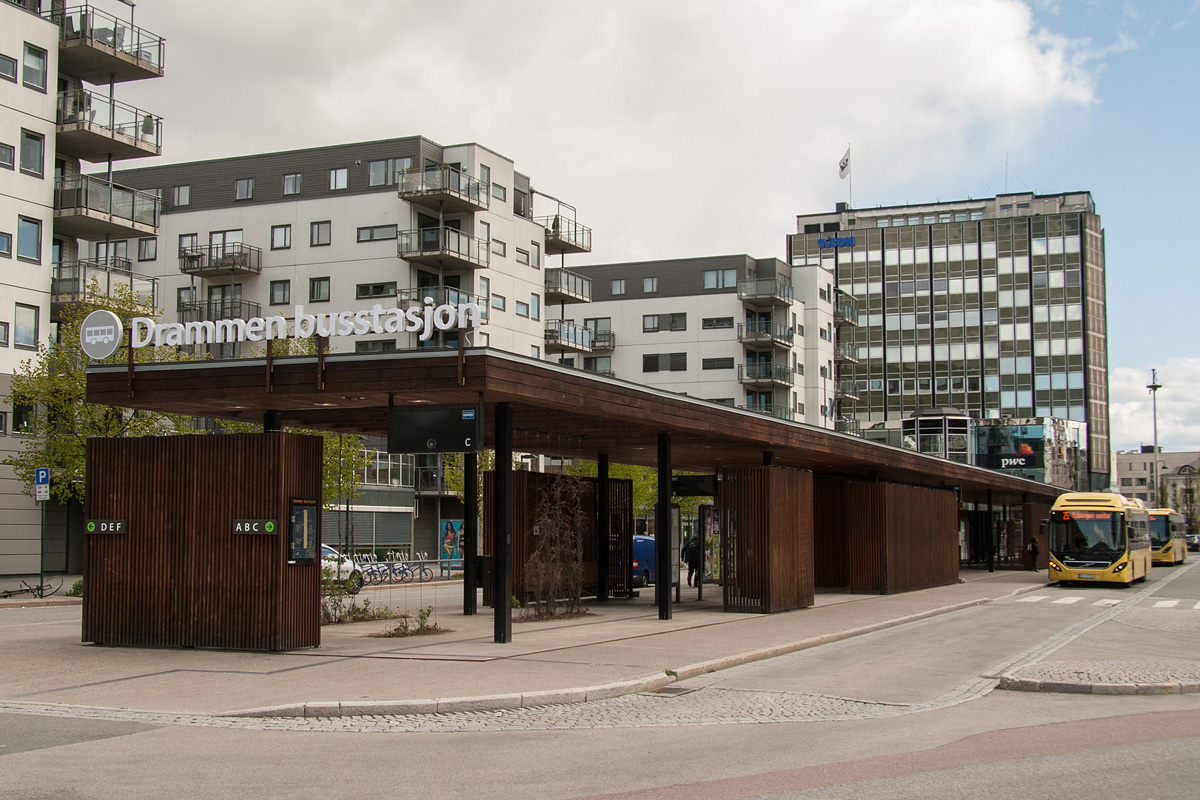
Drammen Bus Station

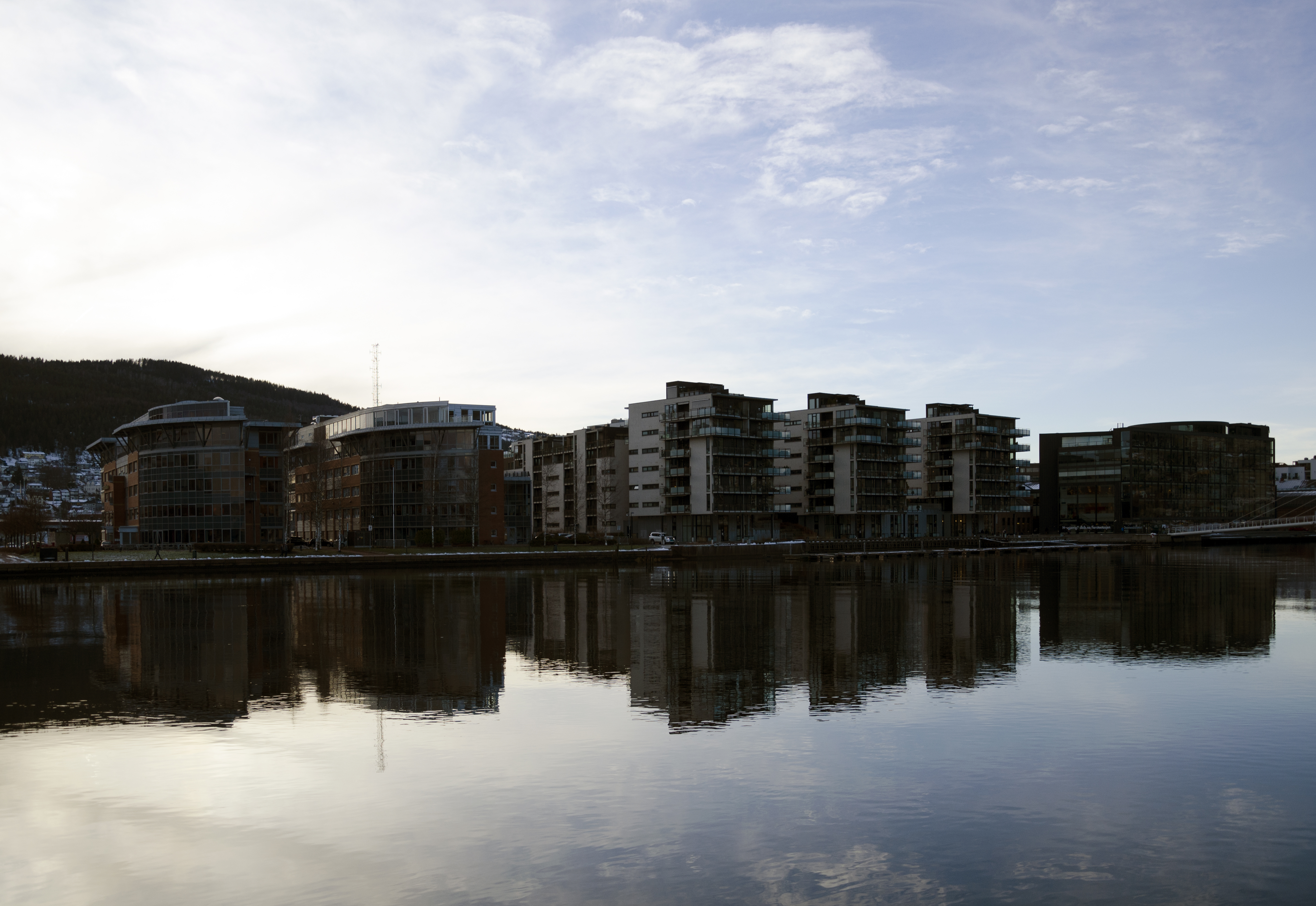
Buildings at Grønland, Drammen

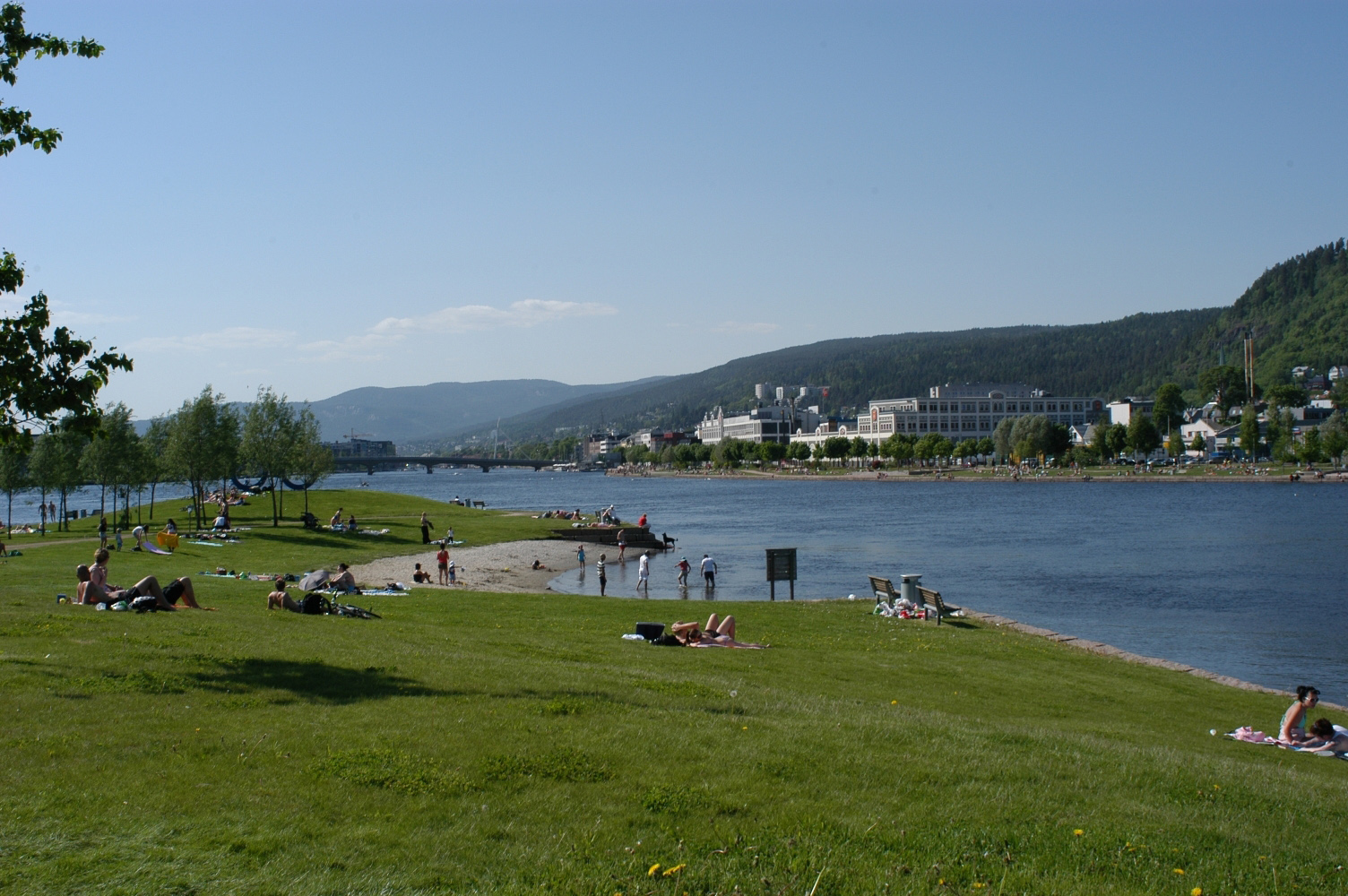
Part of the River Park in Drammen

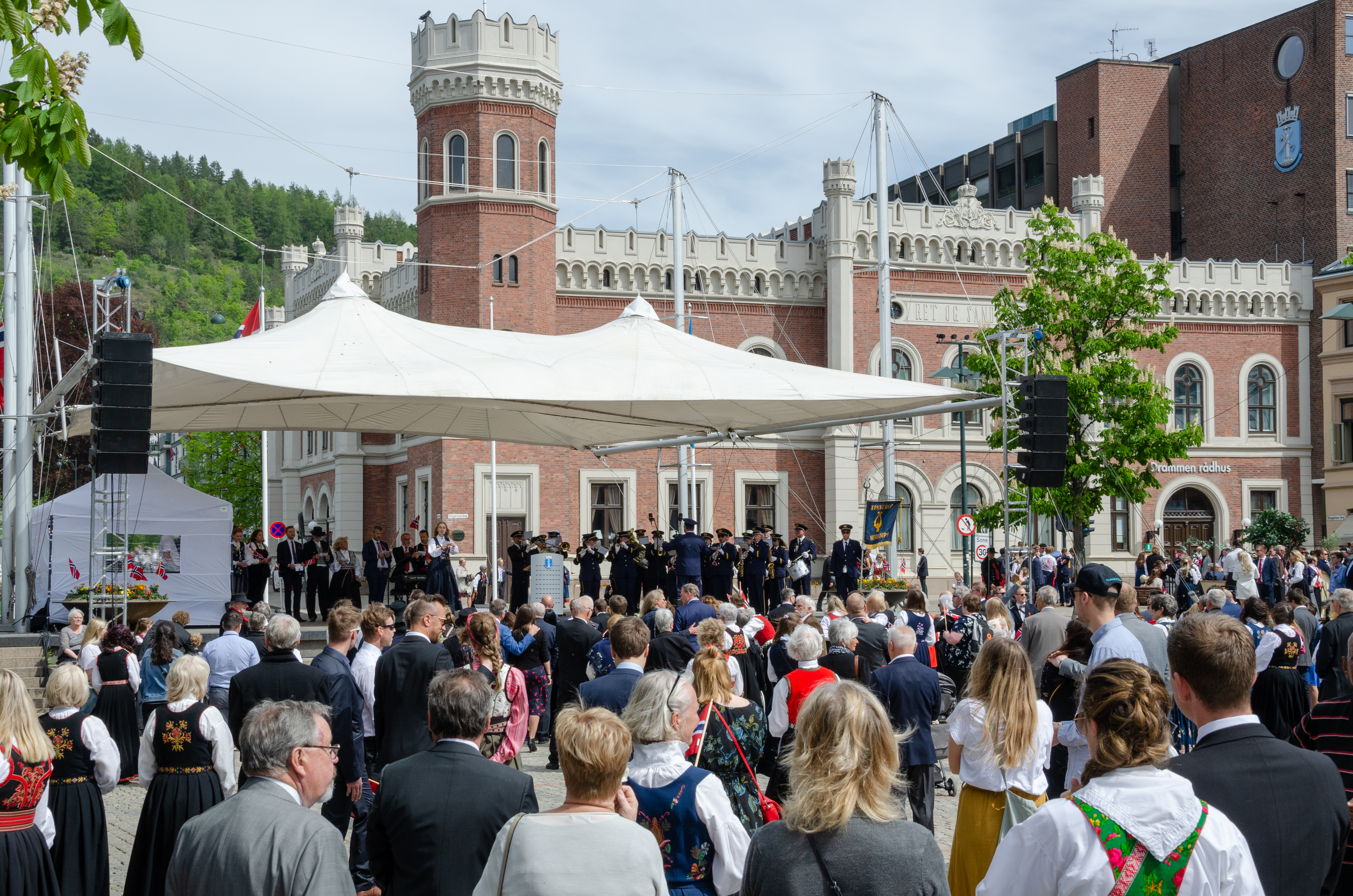
The main square in Drammen on Constitution Day, 2019

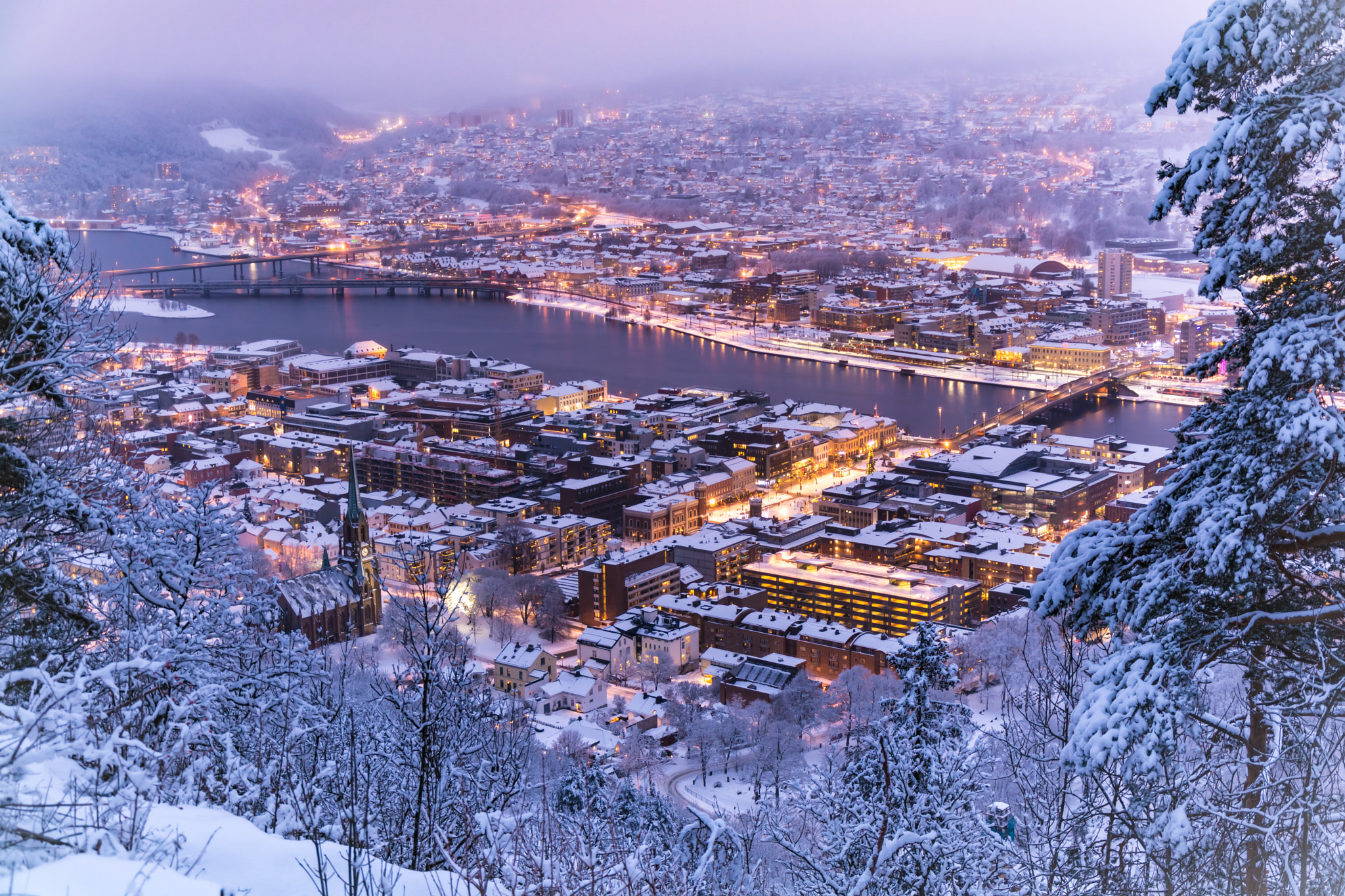
Winter In Drammen

== Bibliography ==
- Tingle, Joseph Child (25 August 1866). "A Town in Ashes". All the Year Round. XVI (383). London: 150–153.

- Attribution to Tingle given in Hall, John Richard Clark (1919). Herbert Tingle, and Especially his Boyhood. London: Society for Promoting Christian Knowledge. pp. 12–13. OCLC 24238768.
