= Arnold Maria Hansson =

Forestry administrator and consultant

Arnold Maria Hansson (10 November 1889 – 5 September 1981) was a New Zealand forestry administrator and consultant. He was born in Drammen, Norway on 10 November 1889.
