= Drammen Bridge =

Road bridge in Drammen, Norway

Drammen Bridge Drammensbrua
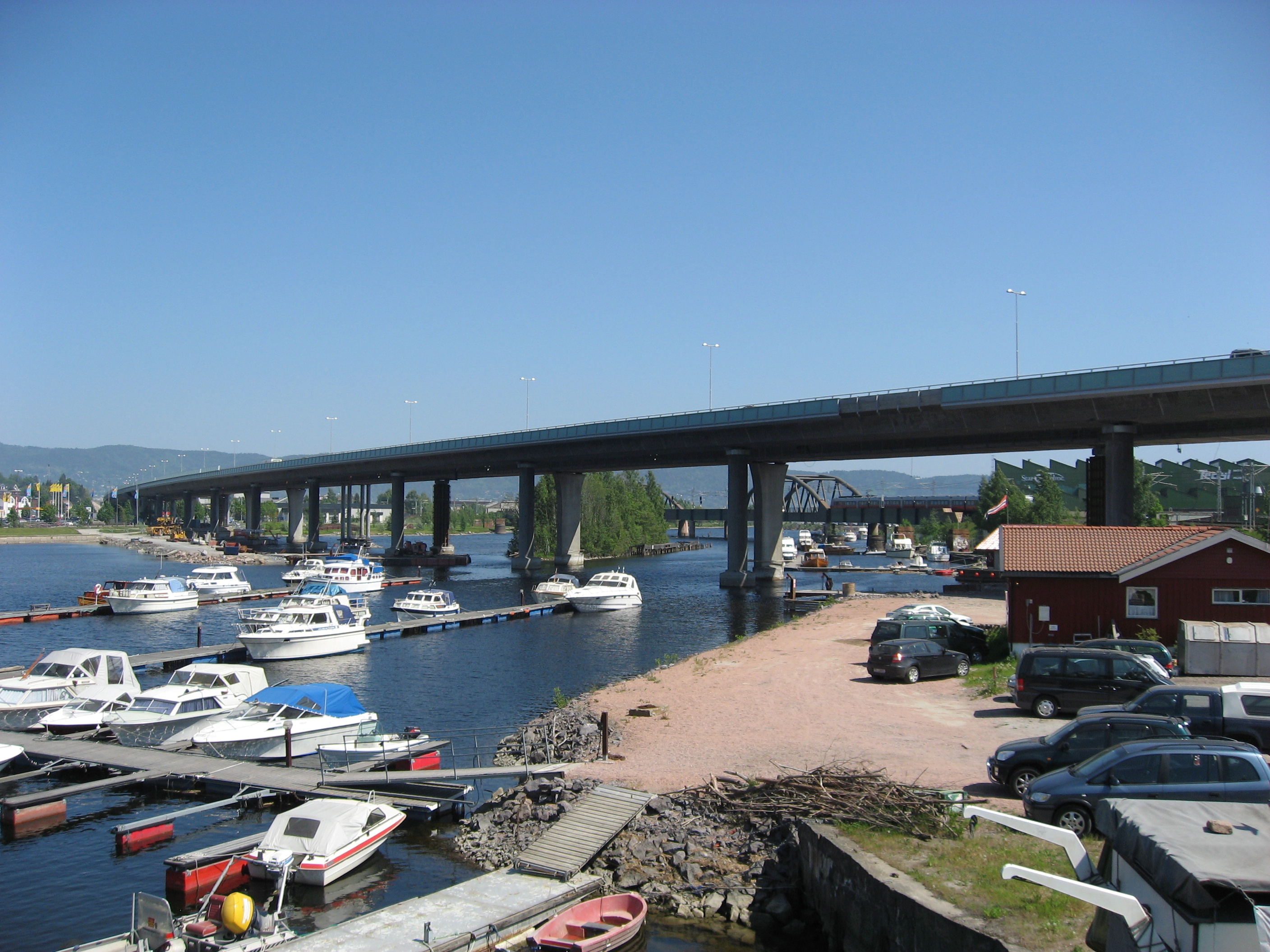
- The bridge in summer 2006.
- Coordinates: 59°44′15″N 10°13′15″E
- Carries: Four lanes on European route E18

Characteristics
- Total length: 1892 metres
- Longest span: 60 metres
- No. of spans: 41
- Clearance above: 11 metres
- Clearance below: 11 metres

History
- Opened: 1975 / 2005

The Drammen Bridge (Norwegian: Drammensbrua) is a motorway box girder bridge that crosses Drammenselva river in the town of Drammen in Norway. It is the longest road bridge in Norway, 1,892 metres (6,207 ft) long. The bridge has 41 spans; the longest span is 60 metres (200 ft). The maximum clearance to the water is 11 metres (36 ft).

The Drammen Bridge was opened in 1975 with two lanes. A parallel bridge was finished in 2005 with two more lanes.

The new bridge has round, slim pillars, while the old one had wide, rectangular pillars. It was decided to replace the pillars under the old bridge, with round pillars similar to the new. This work started shortly after the new bridge opened, and the bridge was closed. The replacement was finished in December, 2006.

== See also ==
- List of bridges in Norway
- List of bridges in Norway by length
- List of bridges
- List of bridges by length
