= Josef Hilmar Jørgensen =

Norwegian organ builder (1892–1961)

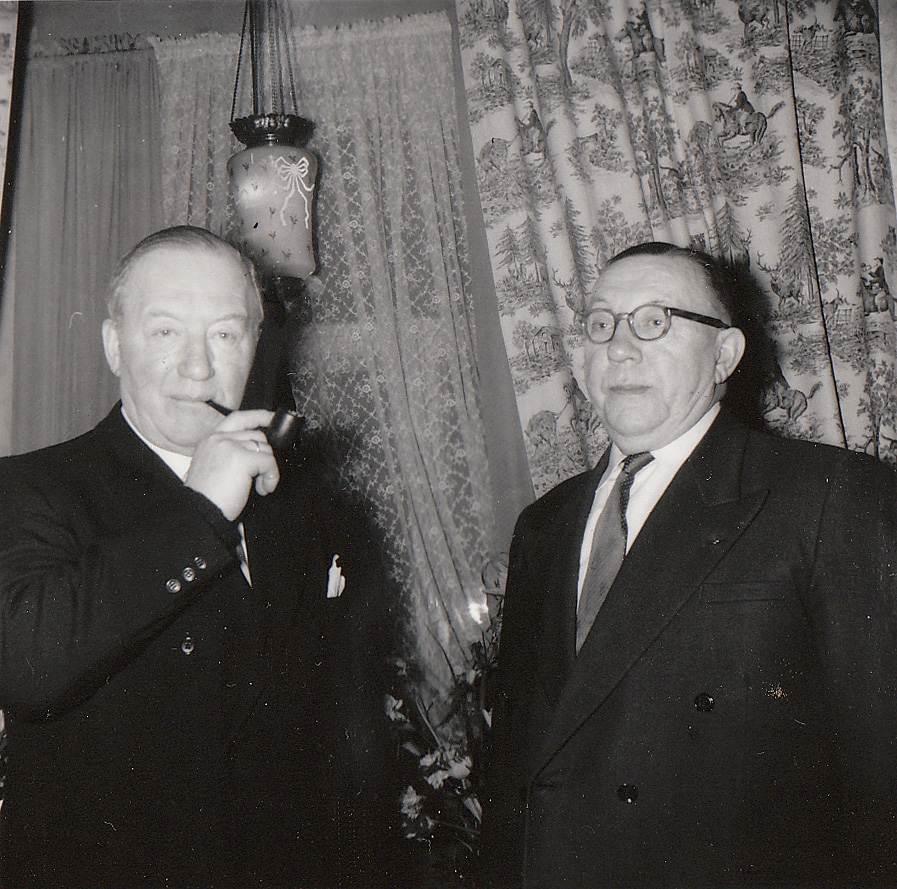
Hilmar Jørgensen (with pipe) and his brother August Nilsen Jørgensen in 1960 at August's 70th birthday

Josef Hilmar Jørgensen (March 28, 1892 – November 2, 1961) was a Norwegian organ builder.

Jørgensen was the owner of the J. H. Jørgensen organ company. The company was originally called Olsen & Jørgensen from 1892 to 1925 (Jørgensen's partner Olsen had already withdrawn from work at the company in 1912).

== Personal life ==
Jørgensen was born in Oslo, the son of the organ builder Jens Henrik Jørgensen (1864–1946) and his wife Marie Guldbrandsen (1869–1911). On May 16, 1922 he married Annette Wirstad (1894–1991), the daughter of the wholesaler Ole Olsen Wirstad (1846–1923) and Karen Hansen (1855–?). The couple's daughter Anne Marie Jørgensen is married to the politician Kåre Willoch. Jørgensen died in Oslo.
