= October 1962 =

Month of 1962

<<	October 1962					>>
Su	Mo	Tu	We	Th	Fr	Sa
	1	2	3	4	5	6
7	8	9	10	11	12	13
14	15	16	17	18	19	20
21	22	23	24	25	26	27
28	29	30	31

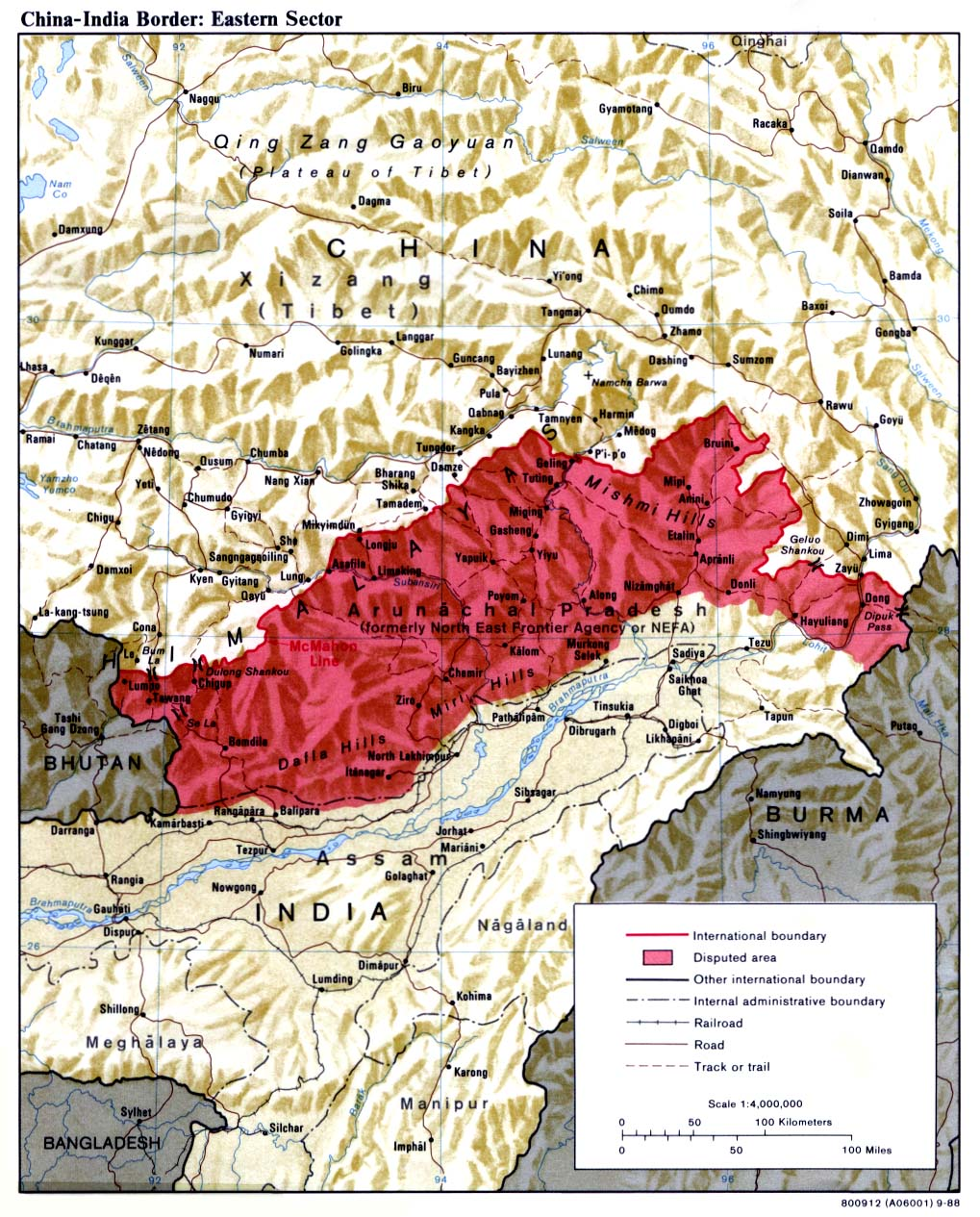
October 10, 1962: China and India, the world's two most populous nations, go to war over border dispute

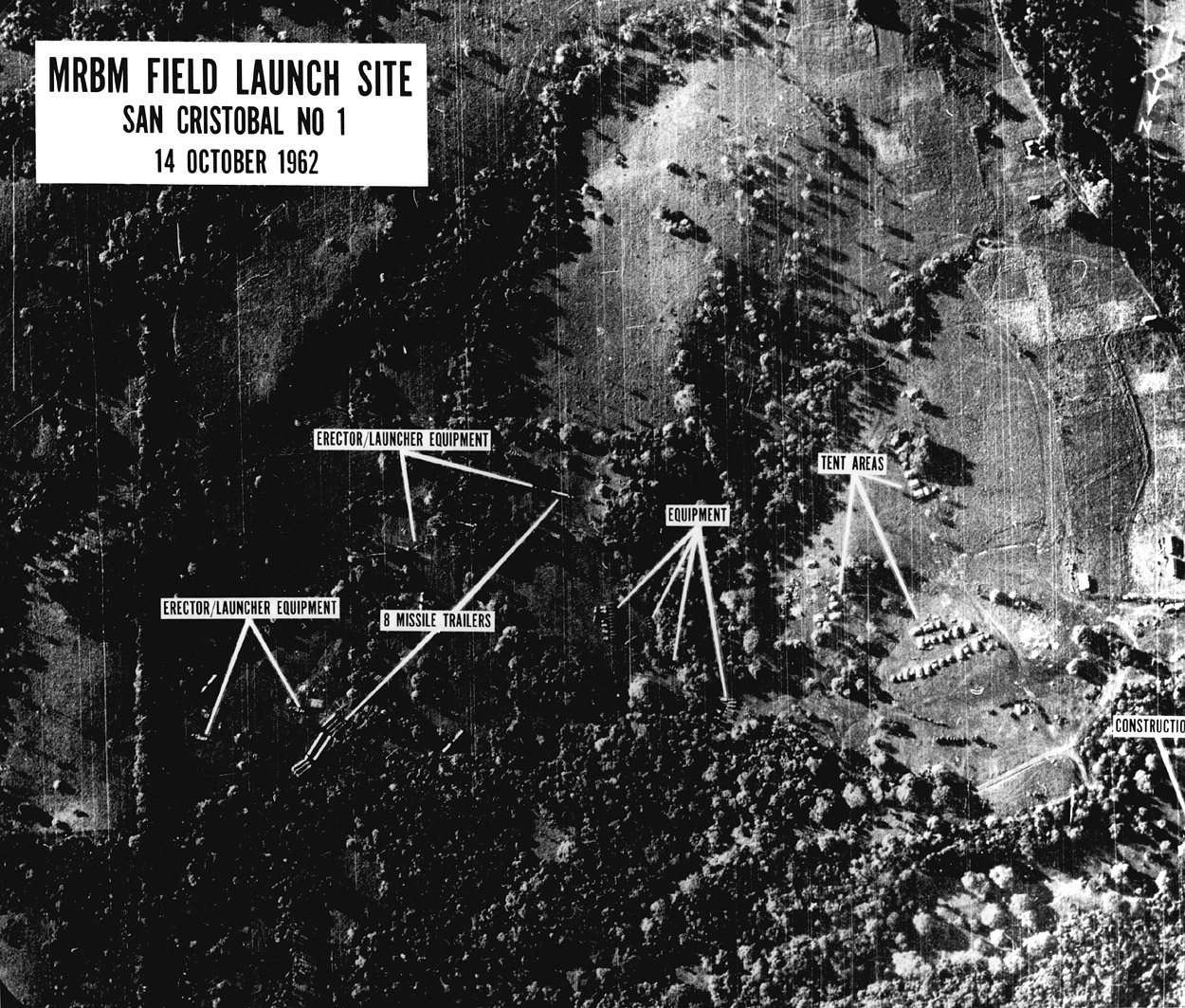
October 14, 1962: Soviet nuclear missiles discovered by the United States in Cuba and both sides prepare for war

The following events occurred in October 1962:

== October 1, 1962 (Monday) ==
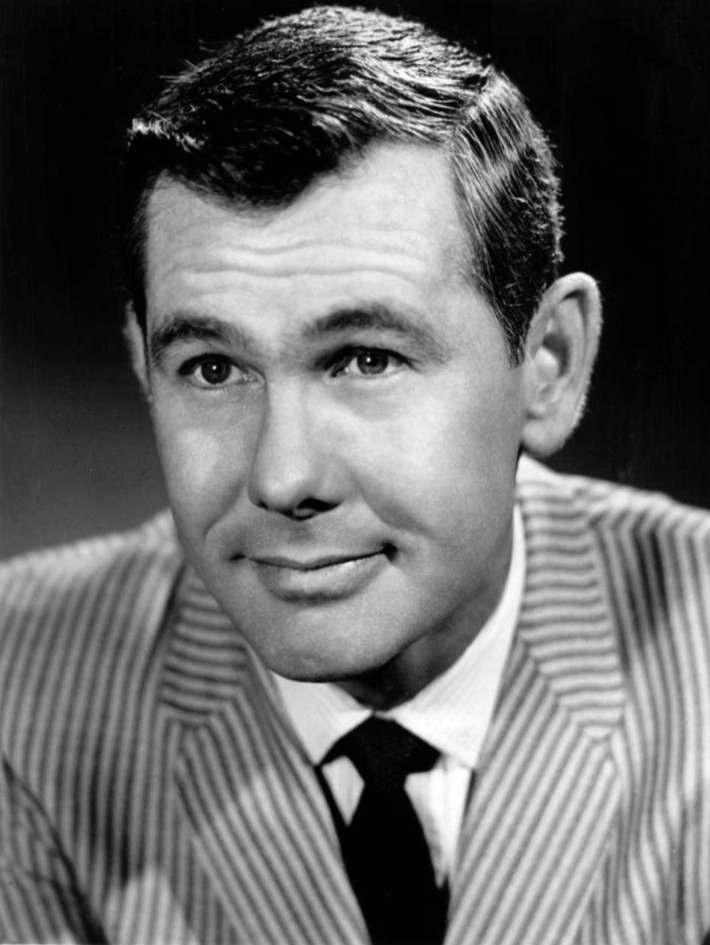
Carson

- Johnny Carson took over as the permanent host of NBC's The Tonight Show, a position that he would hold for 30 years. After Groucho Marx introduced him at 11:30 p.m., Carson and his sidekick Ed McMahon shared the stage with the first guests, Joan Crawford, Rudy Vallee, Ned Brooks (of Meet the Press), Tony Bennett, the Phoenix Singers and Tom Pedi. Carson would host his last Tonight show on May 22, 1992. Earlier in the day on NBC, at 2:00 p.m., another famous host made his debut on The Merv Griffin Show; Griffin's first guest was comedian Shelley Berman.

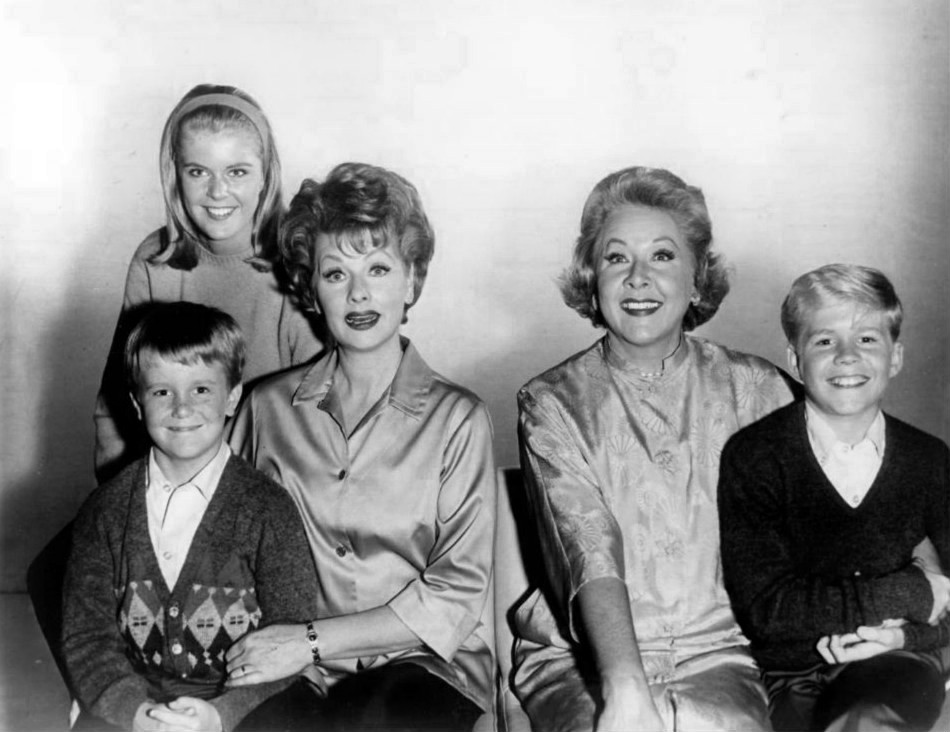
Ball, Vance and TV family

- The Lucy Show, Lucille Ball's follow-up to I Love Lucy, premiered on American TV on CBS at 8:30 p.m. with the episode "Lucy Waits Up for Chris". Based on Irene Kampen's novel Life Without George, the show placed I Love Lucy stars Ball and Vivian Vance in the roles of widow Lucy Carmichael and divorcee Vivian Bagley, along with children. The show would run for 6 seasons before ending its run on March 11, 1968.
- James Meredith, the first black student to enroll at the all-white University of Mississippi, registered for classes while escorted by U.S. Marshals. Meredith's first class was in Colonial History, and only 12 of the 19 students registered attended.
- Four Soviet Foxtrot submarines, armed with nuclear torpedoes, departed bases on the Kola Peninsula in anticipation of a confrontation with the United States over Cuba.
- Netherlands New Guinea was transferred to United Nations Temporary Executive Authority until May 1963.
- U.S. Army General Maxwell Taylor became the new Chairman of the Joint Chiefs of Staff.
- The U.S. Air Force Space Systems Division raised its budget for the Gemini launch vehicle to $181,300,000. The new Development Plan delayed the first Gemini launch to at least December 1963.
- Tropical storm "Daisy" was studied by Project Mercury operations activities for its possible effects on Wally Schirra's Mercury 8 mission, but flight preparations were not delayed.
- Born: Esai Morales, American actor; in Brooklyn

== October 2, 1962 (Tuesday) ==
- A twin-engined Saudi Air Force Fairchild C-123 Provider, said to have been sent by Prince Hassan to Royal supporters in Yemen, and laden with American-made arms and ammunition, defected to Egypt. Its three crew members were granted political asylum.
- Born:
  - Jeff Bennett, American voice actor and singer; in Houston
  - Brian Holm, Danish road cyclist; in Copenhagen
- Died: Heinrich Deubel, 72, former commandant of Dachau concentration camp

== October 3, 1962 (Wednesday) ==
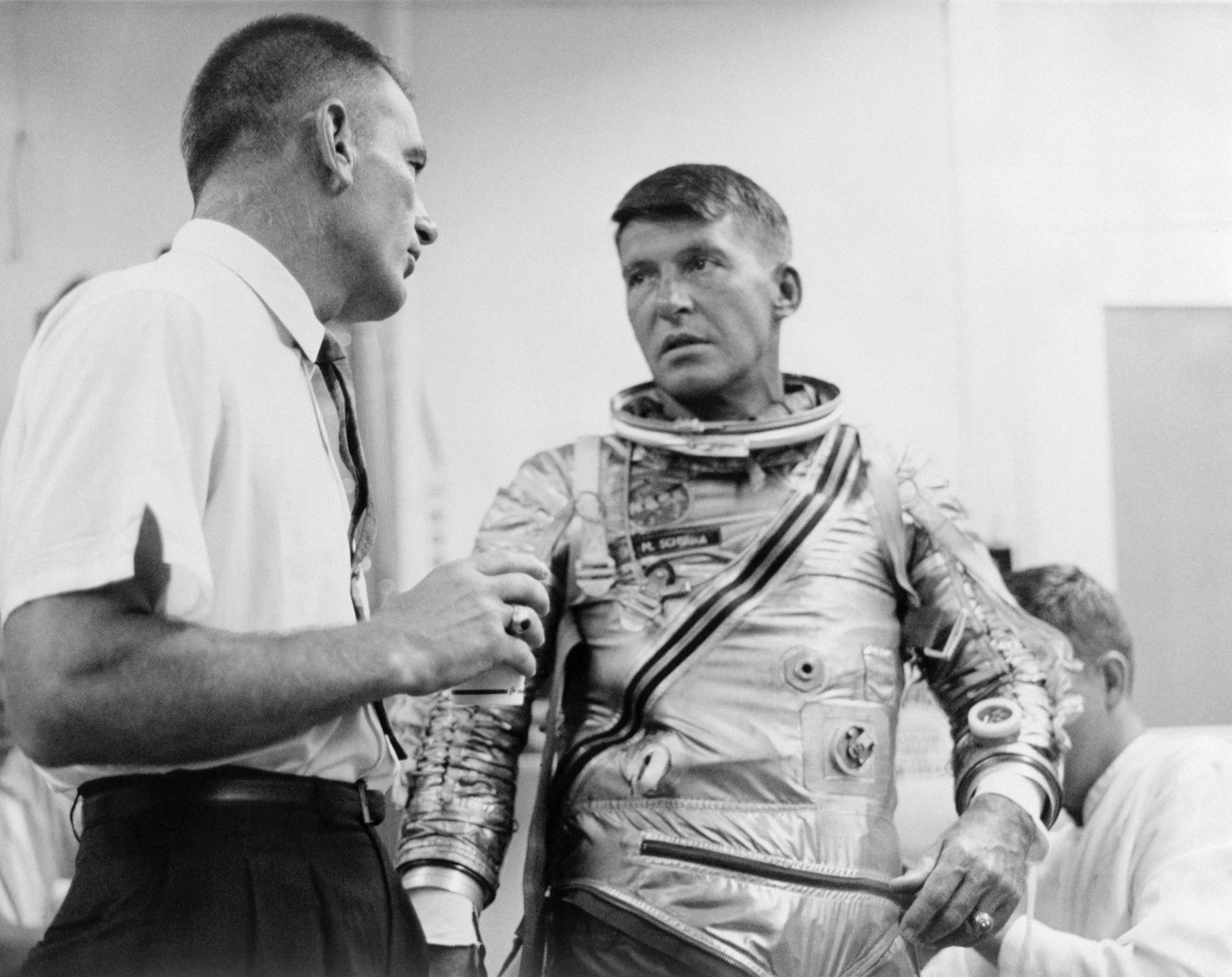
October 3, 1962: Astronauts Deke Slayton (left) and Wally Schirra prior to Mercury-Atlas 8 launch

- Mercury-Atlas 8 (MA-8), designated Sigma 7, was launched from Cape Canaveral with astronaut Wally Schirra. After a 9 hour and 13 minute orbital flight with six orbits, the MA-8 landed 275 miles (443 km) northeast of Midway Island, 9,000 yards (8,200 m) from the prime recovery ship, the USS Kearsarge (CV-33). Schirra was the fifth American astronaut, and ninth person, to travel into outer space.
- Two major modifications had been made to the Mercury spacecraft to fix problems that had happened during the missions of John Glenn and Scott Carpenter. The reaction control system was modified to conserve fuel by using only low-thrust during manual operations, two high frequency antennas were mounted to maintain constant communication. Schirra's only problem was adjusting the pressure suit temperature after being too warm. The flight was the most successful up to that time. The launch was relayed by Telstar 1 satellite to TV audiences in Western Europe.
- A steam boiler explosion killed 21 people and injured 70 at the New York Telephone Company building in New York City. The blast happened at 12:07 p.m. while employees were at lunch in the building's cafeteria. The blast sent the boiler from the basement into the cafeteria, then out through a wall.
- The San Francisco Giants beat the Los Angeles Dodgers, 6–4, to win the deciding game of a best-of-three playoff for the National League pennant. The Dodgers had a 4–2 lead going into the final inning, before the Giants tied the game and then went ahead, gaining the trip to the World Series.
- Born: Tommy Lee, American musician and drummer of heavy metal band Mötley Crüe; as Thomas Lee Bass in Athens, Greece

== October 4, 1962 (Thursday) ==
- The National Assembly of France voted to censure Prime Minister Georges Pompidou for his support of the direct election of the President, with 280 in favor in the 480 member body. Pompidou resigned the next day, but would stay on while new elections were scheduled. The vote marked the only occasion, in the more than 50-year history of the Fifth Republic, that a government was brought down by a vote in Parliament.
- Two Saudi Arabian pilots landed an air force training plane in upper Egypt and were granted political asylum, the second such defection in two days.
- The first nuclear missile in Cuba was installed by the Soviet Union, as a warhead was attached to an R-12 rocket.
- Born:
  - Mike Norris, American actor; in Redondo Beach, California, as the eldest son of actor and martial arts champion Chuck Norris
  - Marc Minkowski, French orchestral conductor; in Paris

== October 5, 1962 (Friday) ==
- The first James Bond film, Dr. No, held its world premiere at the London Pavilion, with Sean Connery as Agent 007. The film premiered to the rest of the UK three days later, and would reach cinemas in the United States on May 8, 1963.
- The Beatles released their first single, "Love Me Do".
- McDonnell and Lockheed reported to NASA on radiation hazards for Gemini crew. McDonnell found no radiation hazard for normal operations with some shielding; with no shielding a 14-day mission would have to be limited to an altitude of 132 miles (212 km). Lockheed warned that solar flares would pose a problem and recommended altitudes of no more than 300 miles (480 km) pending more data on the effects of Project Dominic. A U.S. Air Force spokesman said that tests confirmed that Wally Schirra could have been killed if his flight had taken him above 400 miles (640 km), where an artificial radiation belt had been created by a U.S. high altitude nuclear test. Above 1,000 miles (1,600 km), radiation was up to 1,000 times the normal level. Dr. Charles A. Berry reported that dosimeter readings indicated that astronaut Schirra had received less radiation dosage than expected.
- The phrase "so help me God" was added to the U.S. Armed Forces and National Guard enlistment oaths. As of 2014, the constitutionality of this change had not been ascertained, being in apparent contradiction of the No Religious Test Clause of the United States Constitution.
- Egypt provided a battalion of its Saaqah Special Forces to guard the new Yemeni leader Abdullah as-Sallal during the North Yemen Civil War.
- Born:
  - Caron Keating, Northern Irish television presenter; in Fulham, England (died from breast cancer, 2004)
  - Mike Conley Sr., American Olympic gold medalist in 1992 for the triple jump; in Chicago

== October 6, 1962 (Saturday) ==
- The Chinese leadership convened to hear a report from Lin Biao that PLA intelligence units had determined that Indian units might assault Chinese positions at Thag La on 10 October (Operation Leghorn). The Chinese leaders, on recommendation of the Central Military Council decided to launch a large-scale attack to punish perceived military aggression from India, resulting in the Sino-Indian War.
- The U.S. Committee on Overhead Reconnaissance pointed out that high-altitude photographs of Cuba had not been taken of the western end of the island since August 29, and recommended to the White House that U-2 overflights be made there to determine whether Soviet missiles were being put in place. Flights over west Cuba on October 14 would confirm the presence of offensive missiles.
- The U.S. Marine Corps and U.S. Navy suffered their first helicopter fatalities in Vietnam when a Marine Corps UH-34 Seahorse crashed 15 miles (24 km) from Tam Ky, South Vietnam, killing five Marines and two Navy personnel.
- The last foreign military personnel, including advisers of the U.S. Special Forces, left Laos in accordance with the 75-day period specified in the July 23 "Declaration on the Neutrality of Laos".
- Died: Tod Browning, 81, American film director known for pre-code horror films, including Freaks (1932), Mark of the Vampire (1935), and the first sound-film version of Dracula (1931)

== October 7, 1962 (Sunday) ==
- The cabinet of Iran approved the "Law of Regional and State Associations", extending voting for, and service on, local councils to non-Muslims and females, with the only requirement being that a voter or officeholder believe in one of the "revealed religions". After protests by the Shi'ite Ayatollahs, the law was annulled on November 29.
- Venezuela's President Romulo Betancourt issued Resolution #9, suspending constitutional rights and restricting freedom of the press.
- At a press conference at Rice University in Houston, Texas, U.S. astronaut Wally Schirra expressed said that he had no difficulties with more than nine hours of weightlessness, and that the Mercury spacecraft was ready for a one-day mission.
- Died:
  - Clem Miller, 45, U.S. Representative from California, was killed along with two other people when his airplane crashed in bad weather near Crescent City, California. Miller was on a trip as part of his campaign for re-election and died along with his 13-year-old son and the pilot. Since it was too late to name a new candidate, Miller's name remained on the ballot and received the most votes.
  - Henri Oreiller, 36, French alpine ski racer, was killed when his Ferrari crashed at the Linas-Montlhéry autodrome.

== October 8, 1962 (Monday) ==
- In North Korea, voters went to the polls to vote "yes" or "no" on the 383 candidates for the 383 seats in the Supreme People's Assembly. The Pyongyang government announced a 100 percent turnout (breaking the 1957 record of 99.99%) and 100 percent approval of the candidates (beating 99.92% in 1957); the 100% turnout and approval reports would follow the 1967, 1972, 1977, 1982 and 1986 votes, though in 1992, reported turnout was only 99.85%, albeit still with the 100% approval.
- The October 10 edition of the West German magazine Der Spiegel reached newsstands, with the article "Bedingt abwehrbereit" by Conrad Ahlers, about the Bundeswehr's poor preparedness, causing the so-called Spiegel affair.
- The wreck of the Bremen cog, a ship built in 1380 when the area was ruled by the Hanseatic League, was discovered in the Weser River during dredging operations.

== October 9, 1962 (Tuesday) ==
Uganda's flag

- The nation of Uganda became independent within the Commonwealth of Nations, with Milton Obote as the first Prime Minister, and the white British colonial administrator, Sir Walter Coutts, as the first Governor-General. The following year, Uganda would become a republic, and Coutts would be replaced by a President, the former Bugandan King Edward Mutesa II.
- A train collision killed 28 people and injured 62. The southbound Moscow-Vienna-Rome "Chopin Express" train collided with the northbound Budapest-Warsaw train that had derailed near Warsaw.
- At a military parade in the Polish city of Szczecin, a T-54 tank of the Polish People's Army hit a crowd of bystanders, killing seven children and injuring others.
- Mercury spacecraft No. 20 was delivered to Cape Canaveral for the Mercury 9 (Gordon Cooper) one-day mission, which would be launched on May 15, 1963.
- The MCC cricket team arrived in Fremantle, Western Australia, to begin its 1962–63 tour.

== October 10, 1962 (Wednesday) ==
- The Sino-Indian War began as Chinese troops opened fire on Indian troops and a battle on the border of the world's two most populous nations began. India reported its losses at six dead and seven missing from the first day of fighting, with 11 wounded, while China reported more than 30 casualties.
- Anaasa won the 4.30, the last race ever to be run at Hurst Park Racecourse, Surrey, before the course was sold and re-developed.
- Died: Edmund H. Hansen, 67, American Academy Award-winning sound engineer

== October 11, 1962 (Thursday) ==
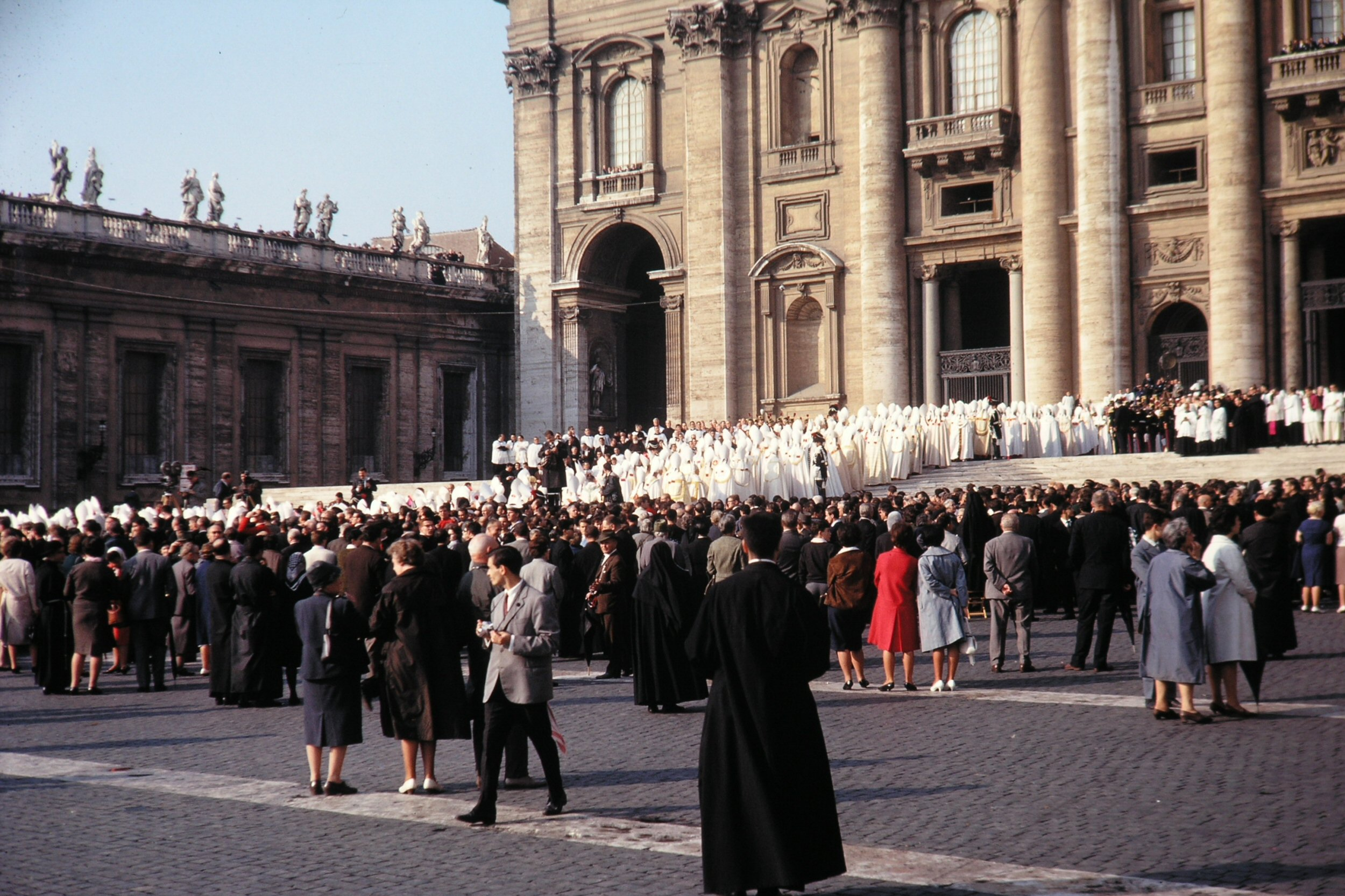
October 11, 1962: The world's Catholic bishops going into the Basilica

- The Second Vatican Council opened, under Pope John XXIII. The 2,500 bishops in attendance walked in a procession through St. Peter's Square and into the Basilica as part of the opening ceremonies. Pope John would die the following year, and the last session of the Council would be closed by Pope Paul VI on December 8, 1965.
- Born: Joan Cusack, American actress; in Evanston, Illinois

== October 12, 1962 (Friday) ==
- On his way from Chennai to a visit to Sri Lanka, India's Prime Minister Jawaharlal Nehru remarked to reporters that his government had directed the Indian Army "to free our territory in the Northeast frontier", implying, incorrectly, that India had decided to engage China in a full-scale war. On October 14, China's paper People's Daily would quote Nehru and tell its readers to expect an invasion of China by India. One author would later write, "Nehru's casual statement only served to precipitate the Chinese attack on India."
- In what would be called the Columbus Day Storm, Typhoon Freda killed 46 people on the west coasts of Canada and the U.S., with winds of more than 145 miles per hour (233 km/h) and causing more than $230 million damage to the U.S. states of California, Oregon and Washington.
- The Bridge of the Americas opened in Panama, exactly three years after construction began. With clearance of over 200 feet (61 m), it was the first to allow traffic to cross uninterrupted between Central America and South America because the bridge did not need to be moved. October 12 was chosen for the start and finish of construction in honor of the October 12, 1492, landfall of Christopher Columbus.
- The Project Gemini Management Panel was formed by the Manned Space Center. The panel was chaired by George M. Low of the Office of Manned Space Flight, and included vice presidents from McDonnell Aircraft, Martin Marietta, The Aerospace Corporation, Aerojet-General, and Lockheed Corporation, with a first meeting on November 13.
- Jazz bassist/composer Charles Mingus gave a disastrous concert at Town Hall, New York City. Earlier in the day, Mingus had punched Jimmy Knepper in the mouth while the two men were working together at Mingus's apartment, with the result that Knepper was unable to perform.
- Born: Amanda Castro, Honduran poet (d. 2010); in Tegucigalpa
- Died: Alberto Teisaire, 71, former Vice President of Argentina

== October 13, 1962 (Saturday) ==
- A treaty between France and the tiny principality of Monaco took effect, to stop wealthy French citizens from moving their residence to Monaco to avoid high taxes. Under Article 7, any French person who had not been "habitually resident in Monaco for five years" would be required to pay French taxes.
- Edward Albee's first full-length play, Who's Afraid of Virginia Woolf? opened on Broadway, starring Uta Hagen as Martha and Arthur Hill as George.
- Anti-apartheid activist Helen Joseph became the first person to be placed under house arrest under South Africa's new anti-sabotage law.
- Born:
  - Jerry Rice, American NFL wide receiver, Pro Football Hall of Famer; in Starkville, Mississippi
  - Kelly Preston, American actress and wife of John Travolta (d. 2020); in Honolulu

== October 14, 1962 (Sunday) ==
- Flying a U-2 spyplane over the area around San Cristóbal, Cuba, U.S. Air Force Colonel Richard S. Heyser took 928 photographs in the space of six minutes. The pictures would reveal that four mobile Soviet missile launchers, capable of firing the SS-4 medium range nuclear missile, had been placed in western Cuba. Other flights would eventually locate 42 nuclear missiles at ten sites in Cuba.

== October 15, 1962 (Monday) ==
- The Canadian Broadcasting Corporation (CBC) debuted a new children's television program on its nationwide affiliates, Misterogers, described initially in CBC's fall schedule preview as "a 15-minute puppet show" shown three days a week. Hosted by Fred Rogers, the show would soon be described as "one of the freshest, most intelligent puppet shows to come along in quite a while." The host had appeared on Pittsburgh as a local offering when educational television station WQED went on the air on April 1, 1954, with Children's Corner and had continued until 1957 as "the community-educational station's most original and popular show".
- At the National Photographic Interpretation Center (NPIC), analysis of the 928 images, taken the day before by the U-2 over flight, showed that offensive missiles and launchers had been placed in Cuba.
- The National Committee of Liberation, an anti-apartheid paramilitary organization in South Africa, destroyed an electrical transformer to cause a blackout in Johannesburg in the most effective sabotage act by the NCL up to that time.
- NASA awarded a contract for $36,200,018 to International Business Machines Corporation to provide the ground-based computer system for Projects Gemini and Apollo as part of the MSC's Integrated Mission Control Center.
- A high frequency direction finding system study was initiated for Project Mercury.
- Born:
  - Per-Erik Burud, Norwegian billionaire entrepreneur and CEO of the Kiwi grocery store chain (d. 2011); in Drammen
  - Yasutoshi Nishimura, Minister of State for Economic and Fiscal Policy for Japan in Prime Minister Yoshihide Suga's government; in Akashi, Hyogo Prefecture

== October 16, 1962 (Tuesday) ==
- Arthur C. Lundahl, the director of the United States imagery intelligence agency, NPIC, informed CIA Director John McCone of the results of Mission 3101, reporting the discovery of medium-range ballistic missile (MRBM) sites, discovering that photographs had "revealed an MRBM Launch Site and two new military encampments located along the southern edge of the Sierra del Rosario in west central Cuba". National Security Adviser McGeorge Bundy then woke up President Kennedy to advise him that missiles were in Cuba but were not yet operational. Kennedy ordered 17 military, political and diplomatic advisers, the ExComm, to assemble at the White House at 11:50 a.m.
- In the U.S., the New York Yankees beat the San Francisco Giants, 1–0, to win the seventh and deciding game of the 1962 World Series.
- Born: Flea (stage name for Michael Peter Balzary), bassist and co-founder of the rock band Red Hot Chili Peppers; in Melbourne, Australia
- Died: Princess Helen of Serbia, 77, former Serbian/Yugoslavian princess, daughter of King Peter I and sister of King Alexander I

== October 17, 1962 (Wednesday) ==
- The discovery of the physical process that would make the light emitting diode— the LED — practical, was announced by Nick Holonyak Jr., and S. F. Bevacqua, engineers with the General Electric Company, as they submitted their paper "Coherent (Visible) Light Emission from Ga(As_{1−x}P_{x}) Junctions" to the weekly journal Applied Physics Letters, which would publish the work in its December 1 issue. Although silicon diodes had been able to generate light on the infrared spectrum, it took a specific alloy of gallium (Ga), arsenic (As) and phosphorus (P) to generate visible light; initially, LEDs were limited to red light, but the GaAsP system would later be perfected with nitrates to produce other primary colors, making it possible to generate the full spectrum.
- The Soviet Union increased its spying capability with the launch of the Kosmos 10 satellite. For the first time, satellites had four cameras that were capable of being moved in order to obtain three-dimensional images.
- Joseph F. Shea of the Office of Manned Space Flight said that a U.S. space station was technologically feasible and could be placed in Earth orbit as early as 1967. Shea's statement came after he asked for suggestions from each of the NASA Headquarters' Program Offices and the various NASA Centers on the potential uses and experiments for a crewed space station.
- The British International Motor Show opened at Earl's Court in London, with new vehicles displayed, including the Triumph Spitfire was among new vehicles showcased during the event.
- Born:
  - Mike Judge, American animator, voice actor, and producer, best known as the creator of Beavis and Butt-Head and King of the Hill; in Guayaquil, Ecuador
  - Kathryn Paterson, Chief Censor of New Zealand from 1994 to 1999; in Umina, New South Wales, Australia (died from cancer, 1999)
  - Yvon Pouliquen, French footballer and manager; in Morlaix
- Died: U Vimala, 62, Burmese Theravada Buddhist monk and vipassana meditation master

== October 18, 1962 (Thursday) ==
- U.S. President Kennedy and Secretary of State Dean Rusk met at the White House with Soviet Foreign Minister Andrei Gromyko and Soviet Ambassador to the U.S. Anatoly Dobrynin. Gromyko told Kennedy that Soviet operations in Cuba were purely defensive, and Kennedy did not tell Gromyko that the U.S. had discovered that the Soviets had nuclear missiles in Cuba.
- The Politburo of the Chinese Communist Party approved plans for General Zhang Guohua to lead the People's Liberation Army to launch a large self-defensive counterattack on India, to take place on October 20.
- Born: Min Ko Naing, Burmese student leader and political dissident; in Yangon

== October 19, 1962 (Friday) ==
- U.S. President Kennedy met with the Joint Chiefs of Staff to discuss the military options for responding to the missiles in Cuba. USAF Chief of Staff General Curtis LeMay advocated bombing of the missile sites in Cuba, while Defense Secretary Robert McNamara recommended a blockade of ships approaching the island. Ultimately, Kennedy, who would spend the day at scheduled speeches in Ohio and Illinois, would opt to blockade Cuba rather than to start a war.
- Wesley L. Hjornevik, the MSC Assistant Director for Administration, announced that cutting $27,000,000 from for MSC's budget request for Gemini meant that the paraglider, Agena, and all rendezvous equipment would have to be dropped from the program. The first Gemini flight, uncrewed, was rescheduled for December 1963, with the second, two-man mission to follow in March 1964 and subsequent flights at two-month intervals. The first Agena targeting mission would happen no sooner than August 1964. The four-month delay required large-scale reprogramming of Gemini development work.
- Anime pioneer Tatsuo Yoshida founded the company Tatsunoko Production in Tokyo.
- Born: Evander Holyfield, American boxer, undisputed World Heavyweight champion between 1990 and 1992, World Boxing Association champion three times between 1993 and 2001; in Atmore, Alabama

== October 20, 1962 (Saturday) ==
- In the Sino-Indian War, a force of 30,000 Chinese troops stopped Indian troops' invasion and overran the outnumbered Indian force that had been ordered into the disputed area. Within days the Chinese Army had gained control of five bridges over the Namkha Chu River and by October 28 were 10 miles (16 km) inside India's territory. The first wave of attacks began at 5:00 a.m. Indian Standard Time, thirty minutes after Chinese radio broadcast an announcement of the victory. The populations of the two nations (670 million for China and 450 million for India) represented one-third of the world's three billion people in 1962, prompting Newsweek magazine to headline an article in its October 29 edition, "A Third of the World at War". During the week that followed, it appeared that the number might increase to half of the world at war, with the Soviet Union (210 million) and the United States (180 million) in a showdown over Cuba, potentially bringing the total to 1.5 billion people at war in the world's four largest nations.
- Both the United States and the Soviet Union conducted high-altitude nuclear tests, already scheduled, even as U.S. President Kennedy was deciding on a confrontation between the two nations over the missiles in Cuba. The U.S. exploded a weapon 91 miles (146 km) over the Pacific Ocean, and the USSR followed two days later with a blast 93 miles (150 km) over Kazakhstan. The Joint Chiefs of Staff raised the nuclear alert status to DEFCON 3.

== October 21, 1962 (Sunday) ==
- Ranger 5, a spacecraft designed to transmit pictures of the lunar surface to Earth stations during a period of 10 minutes of flight prior to impacting on the Moon, malfunctioned, ran out of power and ceased operation, after passing within 450 miles (720 km) of the Moon.
- The sinking of the Norwegian passenger ship MV Sanct Svithun killed 33 of the 79 people on board. The ship had run aground off the Vikna Islands and was refloated, then sank as it got back underway.
- The 1962 Seattle World's Fair (officially, the "Century 21 Exposition") closed in Seattle after a six-month run.

== October 22, 1962 (Monday) ==
- At 7:00 p.m. Washington time, U.S. President John F. Kennedy announced in a nationally broadcast address that "unmistakable evidence has established the fact that a series of offensive missile sites" had been established in Cuba by the Soviet Union "to provide a nuclear strike capability against the Western Hemisphere". He announced "a strict quarantine on offensive military equipment under shipment to Cuba" and warned that any launch of a nuclear missile from Cuba would require "a full retaliatory response upon the Soviet Union". Kennedy implored, "I call upon Chairman Khrushchev to halt and eliminate this clandestine, reckless and provocative threat to world peace and to stable relations between our nations."
- Colonel Oleg Penkovsky, who had secretly been passing Soviet secrets to the United Kingdom, was arrested by the KGB. He would be convicted of treason and executed on May 16, 1963.
- The city of Eden Prairie, Minnesota, a suburb in the Minneapolis-St. Paul metropolitan area, was incorporated.
- Born: Robert Odenkirk, American actor, comedian, and filmmaker best known for his role as Saul Goodman on Breaking Bad and its spin-off Better Call Saul; in Berwyn, Illinois

== October 23, 1962 (Tuesday) ==
- In the "Spiegel affair", publisher Rudolf Augstein of the West German news magazine Der Spiegel, was arrested along with Assistant Chief Editor Conrad Ahlers on charges of treason after the magazine's October 10 issue had published information about the NATO maneuver "Fallex 62". Der Spiegel had reported that the West German military was poorly prepared to defend against an invasion from the East. Other arrests followed, leading to protests by West Germans against the suppression of freedom of the press. Augstein and Ahlers would be released on February 7, 1963.
- As the American blockade of Cuba from Soviet ships was set, the 450 ships of the U.S. Atlantic Fleet and 200,000 personnel prepared for a confrontation, including defense if the Soviets tried an airlift over the blockade. The Soviet freighter Polotavia was identified as the first ship that would reach the quarantine line.
- Art Blakey began recording Caravan at the Plaza Sound Studio in New York City, his first album for Riverside Records, with whom he had signed earlier in the month.

== October 24, 1962 (Wednesday) ==
- The U.S. Navy blockade against Soviet ships began at 10:00 a.m. Washington, D.C. time (1500 hrs UTC and 6:00 p.m. in Moscow). Some of the Cuban-bound Soviet freighters altered their courses to avoid the confrontation, while others proceeded.
- Mars 2MV-4 No.1 (or Sputnik 22) was launched by the Soviet Union, with the intention of making a flyby of the planet Mars and transmitting back images to the earth. When the engines were reignited in order to take the probe from parking orbit toward Mars, the satellite exploded, and debris fell to earth for the next four months.
- James Brown recorded his Live at the Apollo album.
- The film The Manchurian Candidate was released, premiering in the United States at 13 theaters, all in the New York City metropolitan area.

== October 25, 1962 (Thursday) ==
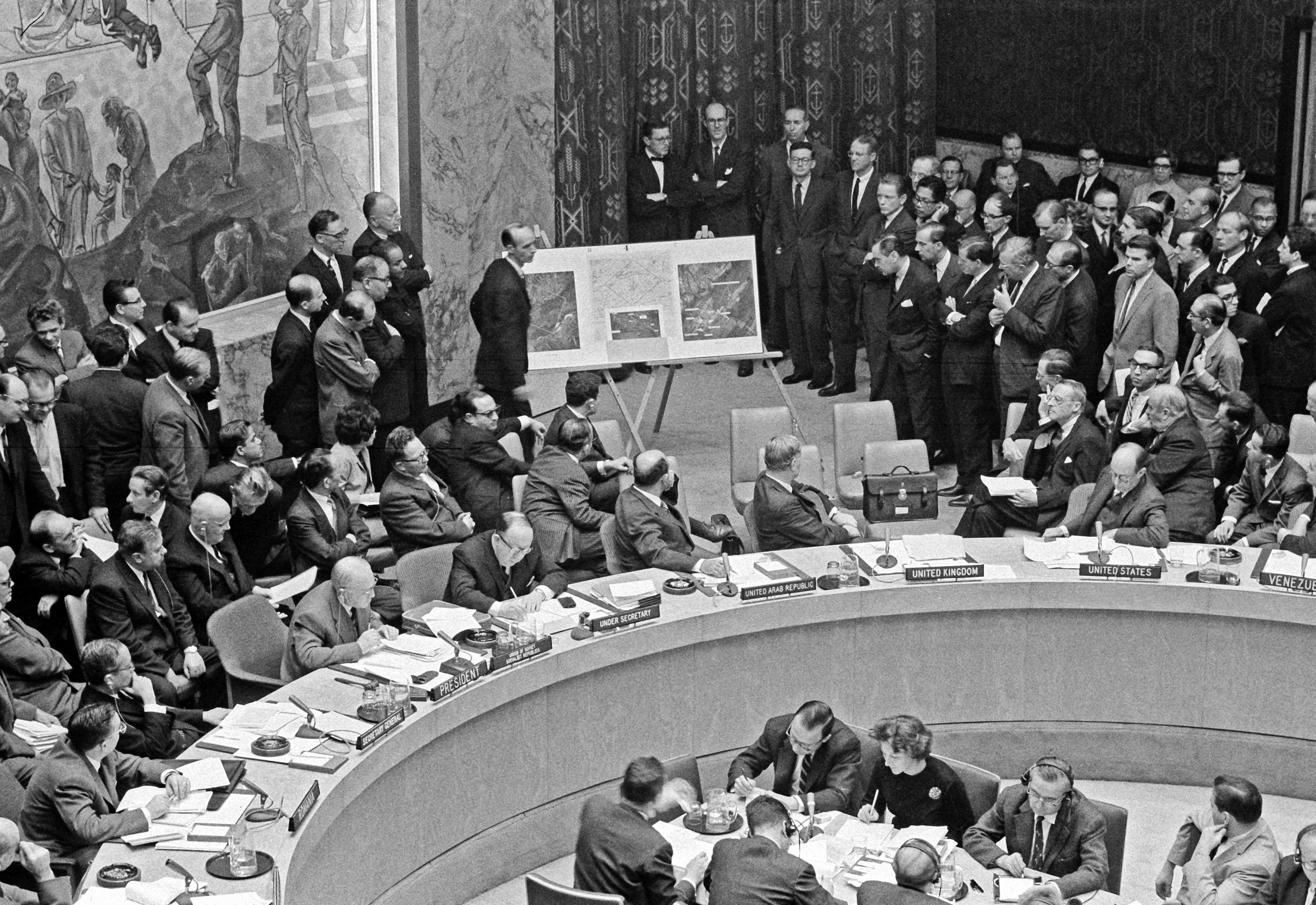
October 25, 1962: U.S. and USSR in confrontation at U.N. Security Council

- At a meeting of the United Nations Security Council, American Ambassador Adlai Stevenson confronted Soviet Ambassador Valerian Zorin with photographs of missile sites in Cuba and angrily asked, "Do you, Ambassador Zorin, deny that the USSR has placed and is placing medium and intermediate range missiles and sites in Cuba? Yes or no? Don't wait for the translation. Yes or no?" Zorin laughed and then said, "I am not in an American courtroom, sir, and therefore I do not wish to answer a question that is put to me in the fashion in which a prosecutor puts questions. In due course, you will have your reply."
- At 6:50 a.m., the American destroyers USS Joseph P. Kennedy, Jr. (DD-850) and the USS John R. Pierce (DD-753) made the first enforcement of the blockade, stopping and boarding the Soviet-chartered ship Marcula, 400 miles (640 km) from Cuba. After spending two hours searching the Marcula and determining that its cargo of trucks, paper, sulfur and auto parts provided no threat, the Navy allowed the ship to proceed with its cargo.
- Abdul Monem Khan was appointed as the Governor of East Pakistan by Pakistan's President, Muhammad Ayub Khan. During his rule from 1962 to 1968, Governor Monem Khan's strict rule of the more than 60,000,000 East Pakistan residents eventually led to the province separating from the rest of Pakistan as the nation of Bangladesh.
- Tropical Storm Harriet was first observed by the Joint Typhoon Warning Center, just off the east coast of Thailand. It crossed into the Indian Ocean, and, during landfall its storm surge, flooded the Laem Talumphuk peninsula in Nakhon Si Thammarat Province. Typhoon Harriet killed 769 people, with another 142 missing and 252 seriously injured.
- Uganda was admitted to membership of the United Nations.
- Born: Borys Kolesnikov, Deputy Prime Minister of Ukraine from 2010 to 2012; in Zhdanov, Ukrainian SSR, Soviet Union (now Mariupol, Ukraine)

== October 26, 1962 (Friday) ==
- The first ever proclamation of a state of emergency in India was made by President Sarvepalli Radhakrishnan as Chinese troops continued their invasion. The emergency would not be rescinded until January 10, 1968. A state of emergency would be proclaimed two other times in the 20th century, on December 3, 1971, and on June 25, 1975.
- A wall collapse caused by a fire at the Sefu Soap and Fat Company in Maspeth, Queens, killed six FDNY firefighters. The news was overshadowed by the ongoing Cuban Missile Crisis.
- Born: Cary Elwes, English actor; in Westminster, as the son of Dominick Elwes and Tessa Georgina Kennedy
- Died: Louise Beavers, 60, American film actress

== October 27, 1962 (Saturday) ==
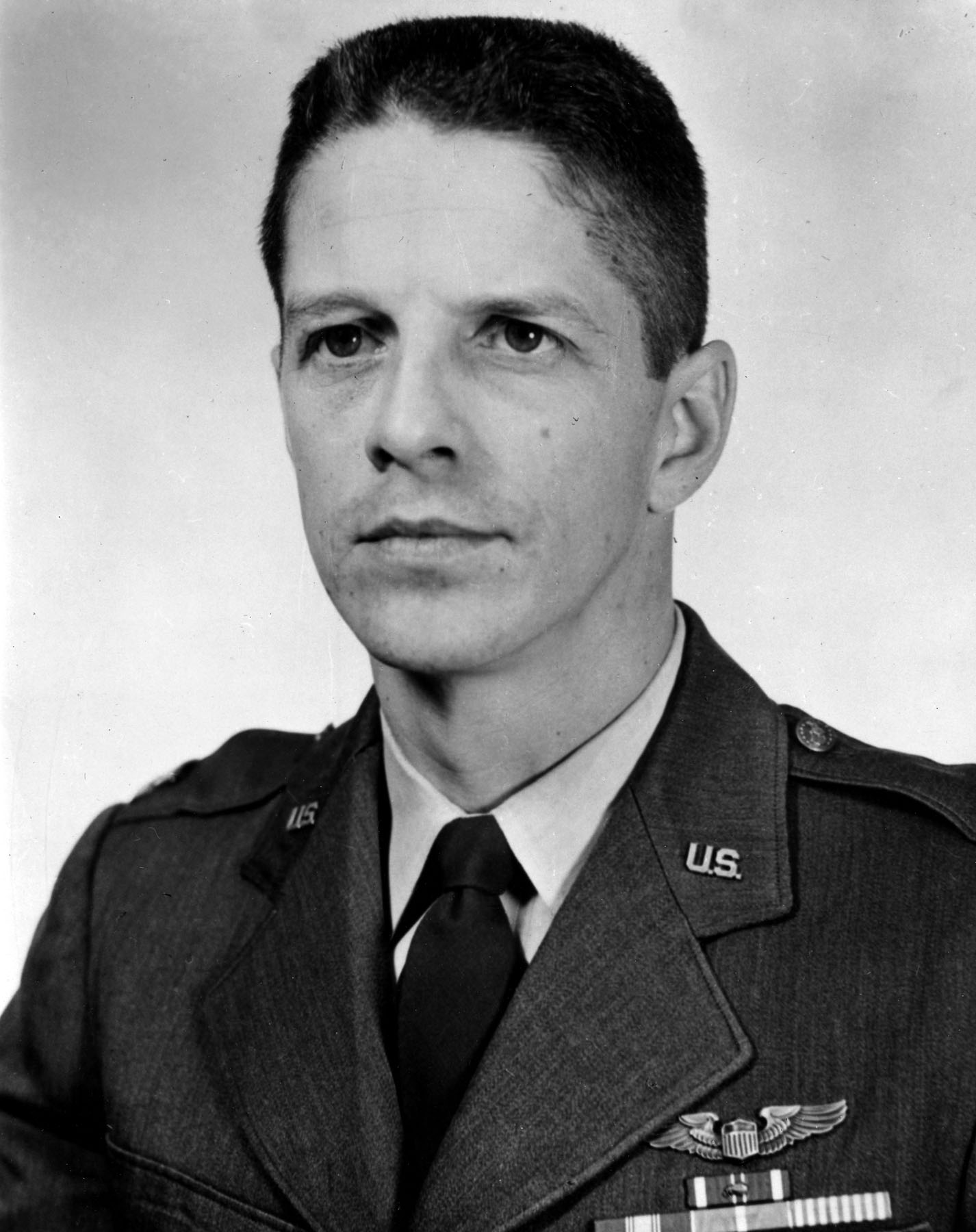
Major Anderson

- At 11:19 a.m. Washington time, USAF Major Rudolf Anderson became the only combatant fatality of the Cuban Missile Crisis when his U-2 airplane was shot down by a surface-to-air missile while he was flying over Cuba. Soviet Army Major Ivan Gerchenov had been ordered to fire missiles, from a station near the city of Banes, at "Target Number 33". On the other hand, Fidel Castro would say in 1964 that the Cubans, not the Soviets, had fired the missile, and a former Castro aide, Carlos Franqui, would write in 1984 that Castro himself had pushed the button to launch the missile. The Joint Chiefs recommended to President John F. Kennedy that the U.S. should attack Cuba within 36 hours to destroy the Soviet missiles. At Washington, General Taylor recommended an air attack on the Banes site, but immediate action was not taken.
- Hours later, the Soviet submarine B-59 was detected by U.S. Navy destroyers in the Atlantic Ocean, and one of the ships began dropping explosive depth charges to force the sub to surface. Thirty years later, a communications intelligence officer on the B-59 would report that Captain Valentin Savitsky ordered a nuclear-armed torpedo to be armed for firing at the U.S. ships, and that the second-in-command, Vasily Arkhipov, persuaded Savitsky to surface instead.
- Heart of Midlothian F.C. defeated Kilmarnock F.C. 1–0 in the 1962 Scottish League Cup Final at Hampden Park, Glasgow.

== October 28, 1962 (Sunday) ==
- The Cuban Missile Crisis came to an end when, at 5:00 p.m. Moscow time (10:00 a.m. in Washington), Radio Moscow broadcast the text of the message from Soviet Prime Minister Nikita Khrushchev to U.S. President John F. Kennedy. "Dear Mr. President," Khrushchev's letter began, "I have received your message of October 27. I express my satisfaction and thank you for the sense of proportion you have displayed and for realization of the responsibility which now devolves on you for the preservation of the peace of the world." Khrushchev went on to say, "I regard with great understanding your concern and the concern of the United States people in connection with the fact that the weapons you describe as offensive are formidable weapons indeed. Both you and we understand what kind of weapons these are. In order to eliminate as rapidly as possible the conflict which endangers the cause of peace, to give an assurance to all people who crave peace, and to reassure the American people, who, I am certain, also want peace, as do the people of the Soviet Union, the Soviet Government, in addition to earlier instructions on the discontinuation of further work on weapons construction sites, has given a new order to dismantle the arms which you described as offensive, and to crate and return them to the Soviet Union." In an agreement worked out by Khrushchev and Kennedy with the assistance of U.N. Secretary-General U Thant, the U.S. pledged not to invade Cuba, and to remove Jupiter missiles that had been placed in Turkey near its border with the USSR.
- In France, a referendum was held to decide on whether the election of the President of France should be done directly through universal suffrage. The proposal for constitutional change was approved by 62.25% of those voting.

== October 29, 1962 (Monday) ==
- The bodies of Lt. Günther Mollenhauer, and several other Germans shot down over the UK during the Second World War, were disinterred from a local cemetery for re-burial at Cannock Chase German war cemetery.
- The British airline East Anglian Flying Services was renamed Channel Airways.
- Died:
  - Einar Gundersen, 66, Norwegian footballer who scored 26 goals in 33 games for the Norway national team
  - George Matthew Adams, 84, American journalist and newspaper proprietor
  - Amy Otis Earhart, 93, mother of Amelia Earhart

== October 30, 1962 (Tuesday) ==
- On the eve of Halloween, Deputy U.S. Attorney General Nicholas Katzenbach arrived at the University of Mississippi in Oxford and told students that anyone caught harassing James Meredith would be subject to arrest and an appearance in federal court for contempt. The unusual action came the day after "a firecracker barrage" was made on the dormitory where Meredith, the only African-American student to be enrolled at Ole Miss, had resided. Earlier, someone had smashed the window of a car in which Meredith was riding with four United States Marshals.
- United Nations Secretary-General U Thant arrived in Havana for a two-day visit to meet with Fidel Castro, and the two conferred the same day for more than two hours in order to pursue the UN's goal of defusing the Cuban Missile Crisis. At U Thant's request, the United States lifted its blockade of Cuba for 48 hours and discontinued overflights for the same period.
- The United Nations General Assembly voted overwhelmingly against membership for the People's Republic of China, with only 42 of the 110 members supporting the resolution. The final vote was 42 for, 56 against, and 12 abstaining.
- Tropical Storm Harriet hit Bangladesh, shortly before dissipating.

== October 31, 1962 (Wednesday) ==
- The apogee of the basic Gemini spacecraft orbit model was set at 167 nautical miles (192 mi) and the perigee of the elliptical orbit at 87 nautical miles (100 mi). The altitude of the circular orbit of the Agena target vehicle was to be 161 nautical miles (185 mi).
- Jawaharlal Nehru, Prime Minister of India, temporarily took on the role of Minister of Defence, following the resignation of V. K. Krishna Menon.
- Died: Thomas Holenstein, 66, Swiss politician who served as Switzerland's head of state in 1951 and 1952 as President of the Swiss National Council
