= November 1962 =

Month of 1962

<<	November 1962					>>
Su	Mo	Tu	We	Th	Fr	Sa
				1	2	3
4	5	6	7	8	9	10
11	12	13	14	15	16	17
18	19	20	21	22	23	24
25	26	27	28	29	30

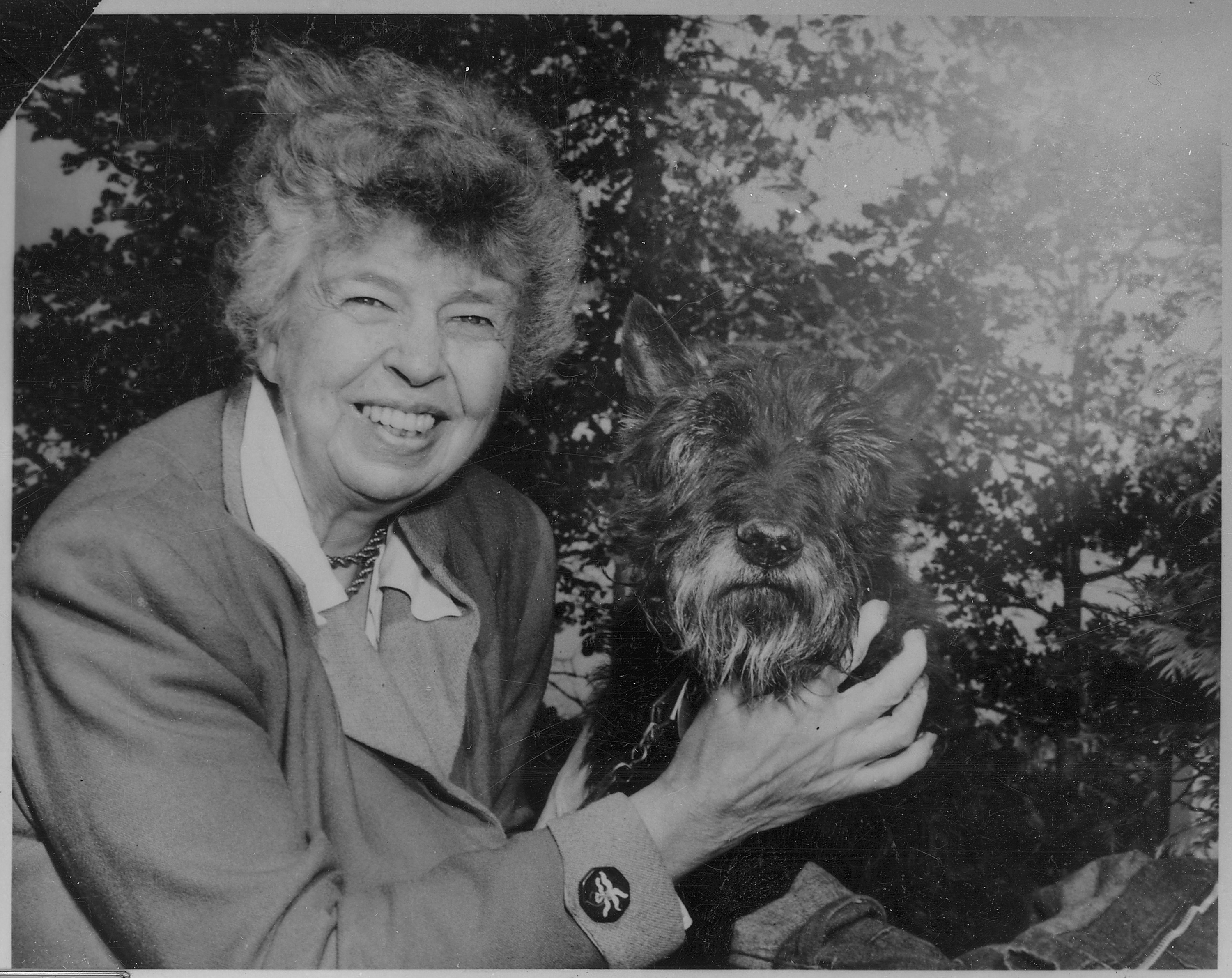
November 7, 1962: Former First Lady of the United States Eleanor Roosevelt dies at age 78

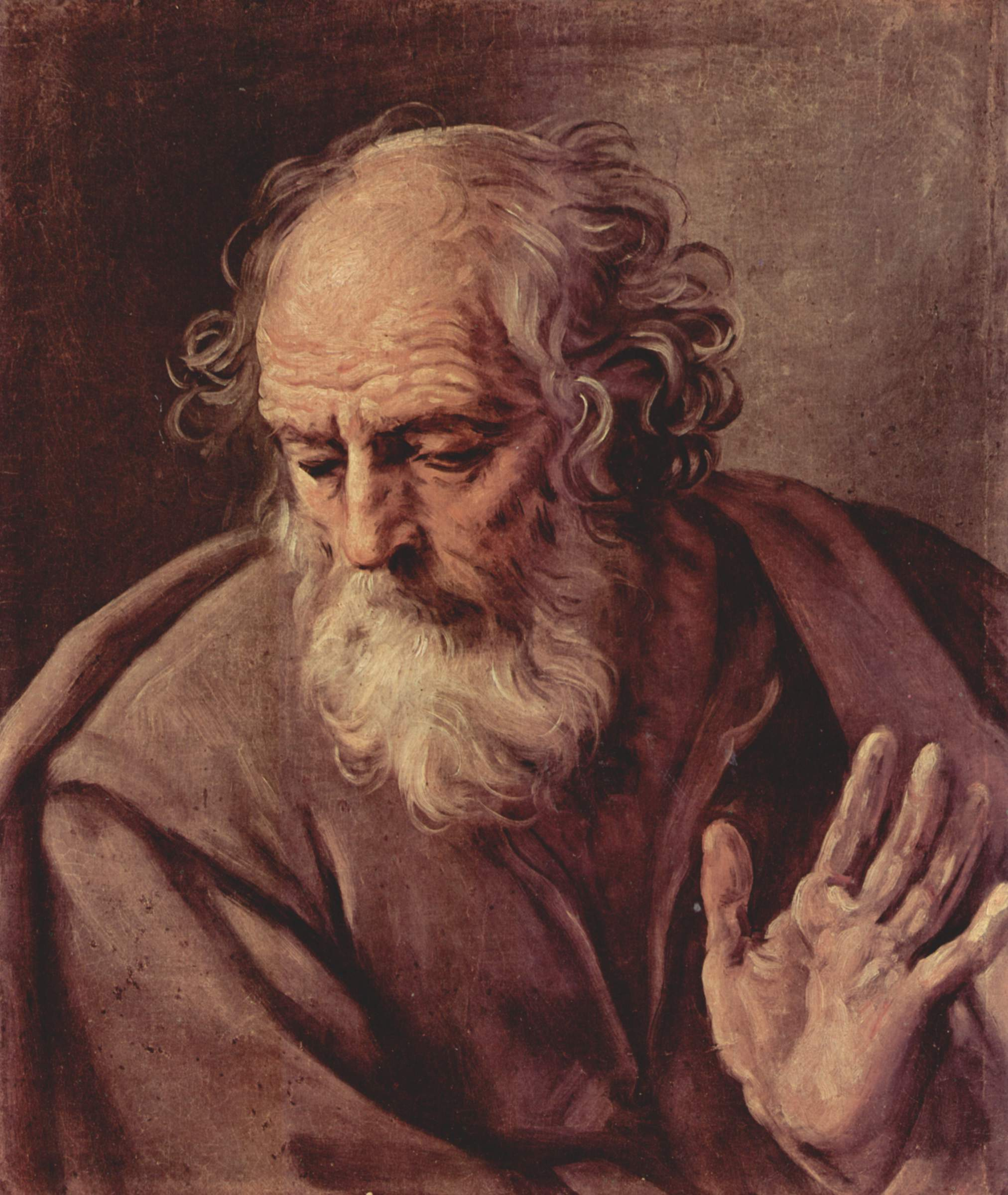
November 13, 1962: Joseph, father of Jesus, added to veneration by Pope John XXIII

The following events occurred in November 1962:

== November 1, 1962 (Thursday) ==
- Mars 1, also known as Sputnik 24, was launched by the Soviet Union as part of its Mars program, with an expected arrival date of June. The probe would come within 120,000 miles (190,000 km) of Mars on June 19, 1963, but the system that adjusted the probe's antenna to maintain contact with Earth would fail on March 21, 1963.
- The United States resumed its arms blockade of ships bound for Cuba, after a two-day suspension during which negotiations had taken place. Meanwhile, the Soviet Union began dismantling its missiles there.
- The Mercury Simulator, which had been moved from Virginia's Langley Field on July 23, was installed and readied for operations in Texas in a Manned Spacecraft Center (MSC) building at Ellington Air Force Base in Houston.
- Soviet scientist Lev Landau was awarded the 1962 Nobel Prize for Physics in recognition of "his pioneering theories for condense matter, especially liquid helium".
- The first issue of the comic series Diabolik was published in Italy.
- Born: Anthony Kiedis, American rock musician and singer for Red Hot Chili Peppers; in Grand Rapids, Michigan
- Died:
  - Pyotr Dolgov, 42, colonel in the Soviet Air Force and balloonist. Dolgov and Col. Yevgeni Nikolayevich Andreyev attempted parachute jumps from a Volga balloon gondola, Andreyev at an altitude of 25,458 metres (83,524 ft) and Dolgov at 28,640 metres (93,960 ft). Andreyev successfully reached the ground and set an official record for the longest distance free-fall parachute jump, but Dolgov was killed by the explosive decompression of his pressure suit. Both men would be named Heroes of the Soviet Union on December 12, 1962.
  - Ricardo Rodríguez, 20, Mexican racing driver, was killed in a crash while practicing for the Mexican Grand Prix at Magdalena Mixhuca Circuit.

== November 2, 1962 (Friday) ==
- A final agreement was reached between the Soviet Union and the United States on the terms for Soviet removal of nuclear missiles from Cuba and American verification. U.S. President John F. Kennedy announced the plan, resolving the Cuban Missile Crisis on television that evening.
- In response to the Sino-Indian War, the United States began airlifting weapons to India, with U.S. Air Force C-130 transport planes transporting mountain artillery from its West German bases to match the weaponry of the People's Republic of China.
- The Australian Ballet gave its first ever performance.
- Born: David Brock, American journalist and founder of Media Matters for America; in Washington, D.C.
- Died:
  - Godfrey Lowell Cabot, 101, American industrialist and philanthropist
  - Tripuraneni Gopichand, 52, Telugu language writer

== November 3, 1962 (Saturday) ==
- The earliest use of the term "personal computer" by the media was made in The New York Times in a story about John W. Mauchly's speech the day before to the American Institute of Industrial Engineers. Mauchly, "inventor of some of the original room-size computers" said that "in a decade or so", everyone would have their own computer with "exchangeable wafer-thin data storage files to provide inexhaustible memories and answer most problems". Mauchly was quoted as saying, "There is no reason to suppose the average boy or girl cannot be master of a personal computer."
- A group of bandits murdered 25 passengers and the driver on a bus that was traveling near the city of Neiva, Huila in Colombia. The group appeared on the road, ordered the bus to stop, fired guns inside and then hacked the occupants to death with machetes. Six other people survived the attack with injuries.
- As the state of emergency in India continued, the Defence of India Ordinance took effect. President Sarvepalli Radhakrishnan suspended Article 21 (preventing the deprivation of life or liberty without due process) and Article 22 (prohibiting "preventive detention") of the Constitution of India.
- In what one author describes as a milestone in the term "country music" replacing what had been referred to as "country and western", Billboard magazine renamed its "Hot C&W Singles" chart to "Hot Country Singles" and stopped referring to "western" music altogether.
- Born: Jacqui Smith, British politician and former Home Secretary, known for her involvement in the United Kingdom parliamentary expenses scandal; in Malvern, Worcestershire
- Died: Harlow Curtice, 69, American automobile executive and President of General Motors from 1953 to 1958

== November 4, 1962 (Sunday) ==
- The United States conducted an atmospheric nuclear test for the last time, and all of its tests since then have been made underground. The Soviet Union would halt atmospheric testing less than two months later, the last explosion being on Christmas Day. The last atmospheric test ever would be by China on October 16, 1980.
- The body of USAF Major Rudolf Anderson, the only fatality in the Cuban Missile Crisis, was returned to the United States by Cuba.
- The first Mexican Grand Prix was won by Jim Clark and Trevor Taylor.
- Born:
  - Jean-Pierre Bemba, Congolese presidential candidate in 2006, former vice-president, and convicted war criminal; in Bokada
  - Amy B. Smith, American computer engineer; in Lexington, Massachusetts
- Died: Enos, 5, the only chimpanzee to orbit the Earth. Enos was sent up by the U.S. aboard the Mercury-Atlas 5 (MA-5) spacecraft three months before John Glenn's orbital flight. The chimpanzee had been sick and under night and day observation and treatment for two months before his death. He was afflicted with shigella dysentery, a type resistant to antibiotics, and this caused his death. Officials at Holloman Air Force Base in New Mexico, where Enos died, said that there was "no connection with the two-orbit space flight the chimp made Nov. 29, 1961."

== November 5, 1962 (Monday) ==
- President Ayub Khan of Pakistan was given a note from U.S. Ambassador Walter P. McConaughy, on authorization from President Kennedy, which said that "The Government of the United States of America reaffirms its previous assurances to the Government of Pakistan that it will come to Pakistan's assistance in the event of aggression from India against Pakistan." The existence of the pledge was kept secret, but in 1971, National Security Adviser Henry Kissinger would reveal its existence to Anatoly Dobrynin, the Soviet Ambassador to the U.S.
- A coal mining disaster in Ny-Ålesund, on the Arctic island of Spitsbergen, killed 21 people. The Norwegian government would be forced to resign in August 1963 in the aftermath of this accident.
- Saudi Arabia broke off diplomatic relations with Egypt, following a period of unrest partly caused by the defection of several Saudi princes to Egypt.
- Goddard Space Flight Center awarded contracts totaling almost $12,000,000 to modify NASA's Manned Space Flight Tracking Network to support long-duration and rendezvous missions. The contracts were with the Canoga Electronics Corporation for the tracking antenna acquisition aid system ($1,045,000); Radiation, Inc. for digital command encoders ($1,950,000); Collins Radio Company, for the radio frequency command system ($1,725,000); and Electro-Mechanical Research, Inc. for the pulse code modulation system ($7,376,379).
- The Rotary Club service organization established the Rotary Interact program for boys aged 12 to 18, with the first chapter in Melbourne, Florida.

== November 6, 1962 (Tuesday) ==
- In midterm elections in the United States, the ruling Democratic Party maintained control of the House of Representatives (261–174) and increased its majority in the Senate (64–36). Former U.S. Vice-president Richard M. Nixon, who had narrowly lost the 1960 presidential election to John F. Kennedy, was heavily defeated in his bid to become Governor of California, while the President's younger brother, 30-year-old Teddy Kennedy, was elected U.S. Senator for Massachusetts.
- In his first meeting with his cabinet, Saudi Arabia's Prime Minister and Crown Prince Faisal bin Abdulaziz Al Saud (who would become the King in 1964) announced the immediate abolition of slavery within the Kingdom and plans to have the government pay owners for the manumission of their slaves as part of a program of modernization and reform.
- The United Nations General Assembly passed a resolution condemning South Africa's racist apartheid policies and called for all UN member states to cease military and economic relations with the nation. The result was 67 in favor, 16 against (including the U.S., the UK, France, Japan, Canada, New Zealand and South Africa), and 27 abstaining.
- James E. Mills, the editor of the Birmingham Post-Herald, was arrested for violating Alabama's state election laws after publishing an editorial in that newspaper, urging voters to support a proposed change in city government. Under the law, soliciting votes on election day was a criminal offense. A trial court initially dismissed the charges as an unconstitutionally-broad interpretation of the law against electioneering on the day of an election, but the Alabama Supreme Court would reverse the dismissal and send the case back to trial. On May 23, 1966, the U.S. Supreme Court, in Mills v. Alabama, would reverse the Alabama Court, with Justice Hugo Black noting that "Suppression of the right of the press to... contend for or against change, which was all this editorial did, muzzles one of the very agencies the framers of our Constitution thoughtfully and deliberately selected to improve our society and keep it free."
- B. F. Goodrich delivered a prototype full-pressure suit to MSC for evaluation by Life Systems Division. The partial-wear feature of this suit, demanded by the long-duration missions planned for the Gemini program, comprised detachable sleeves, legwear and helmets. MSC requested Goodrich to provide 14 more suits based on this design, varying only in size. The prototype suit was designated as G-2G-1 and the remaining suits were designated G-2G-2 through G-2G-15. MSC requested extensive design changes after evaluating G-2G-1. The final model, was G-2G-8, would be delivered to MSC on January 21 but would later be rejected in favor of a different Gemini space suit designed by David Clark Company, Inc.. The Clark suit would incorporate Goodrich helmets, gloves, and additional hardware.
- Voters in San Francisco, Alameda County and Contra Costa County, California approved the creation of the Bay Area Rapid Transit (BART) system.

== November 7, 1962 (Wednesday) ==
- Soviet Premier Khrushchev announced that the withdrawal of Soviet missiles from Cuba was complete. By agreement of the two superpowers, the United States Navy searched all Soviet vessels leaving Cuba to ensure that the missiles were being transported back to the USSR, and over the next three days, all 42 ballistic missiles had passed through the inspection, bringing an end to the Cuban Missile Crisis.
- South African dissident Nelson Mandela began a five-year prison sentence. Partway through his time behind bars, he was indicted and convicted for other crimes, and remained in prison for an additional 22 years, until 1990. In 1994, he would be elected the first black President of South Africa.
- The morning after losing his race for California Governor, a bitter Richard M. Nixon told reporters that "You don't have Nixon to kick around any more, because, gentlemen, this is my last press conference". After his "last press conference", Nixon would not hold an event for a year, but would appear at a conference on November 11, 1963.
- The Convention on Consent to Marriage, Minimum Age for Marriage, and Registration of Marriages was opened for signature and ratification by United Nations General Assembly resolution 1763 A (XVII).
- Died: Eleanor Roosevelt, 78, former First Lady of the United States, died at her apartment on 55 East 74th Street in Manhattan from cardiac failure due to aplastic anemia and tuberculosis.

== November 8, 1962 (Thursday) ==
- Glenn Hall, goalie for the Chicago Black Hawks of the National Hockey League, ended his streak of consecutive games at 552, taking himself out of the game against the visiting Boston Bruins ten minutes after it started. "It was the first time he missed a minute of play since the first game of the 1955–56 season," a wire service report noted.
- Parliamentary elections were held in the Faroe Islands for the 29 seats of the Løgting. No party came close to a majority, but the Social Democratic Party had a plurality with 8 seats.
- Died: Willis H. O'Brien, 76, American special effects producer whose stop-motion animation earned him an Academy Award in 1950

== November 9, 1962 (Friday) ==
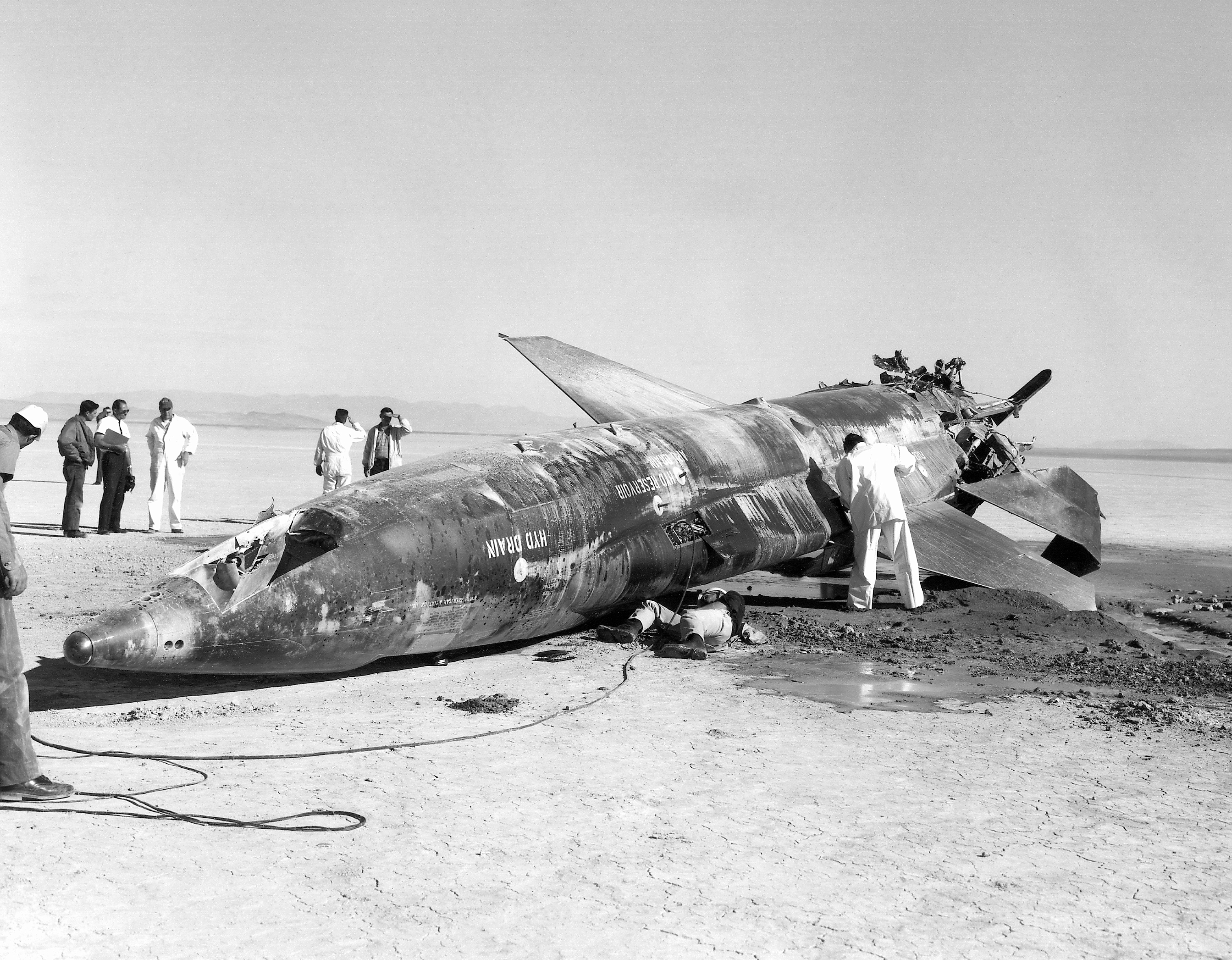
November 9, 1962: Damaged North American X-15-2 after emergency landing

- American test pilot John B. McKay was seriously injured in a forced landing of a North American X-15 spaceplane at Mud Lake, Nevada. Although McKay's injuries did not appear to be disabling at the time, they would eventually shorten his career.
- The first Project Gemini sled ejection test was conducted at Naval Ordnance Test Station. Despite its designation, this test did not call for seats actually to be ejected. Its purpose was to provide data on the aerodynamic drag of the test vehicle and to prove the test vehicle's structural soundness in preparation for future escape system tests. The test vehicle, mounted by boilerplate spacecraft No. 3, was a rocket-propelled sled running on tracks. The boilerplate spacecraft was severely damaged when one of the sled motors broke loose and penetrated the heatshield, causing a fire which destroyed much instrumentation and equipment.
- Brigadier Sir Bernard Fergusson became Governor-General of New Zealand, the last British native to be appointed to that position.
- India's Defence Minister Krishna Menon was forced to resign as the Sino-Indian War proved to be disastrous to India.
- Born: Steve "Silk" Hurley, American club DJ, house music producer, and songwriter; in Chicago
- Died: Louise Hanson Dyer, 78, Australian music publisher and patron of the arts

== November 10, 1962 (Saturday) ==
- The funeral service for Eleanor Roosevelt took place at St. James Episcopal Church in Hyde Park, New York. Sitting next to each other in the same pew were two former Presidents of the United States (Harry S. Truman and Dwight D. Eisenhower), the current President (John F. Kennedy) and the next President, vice-president Lyndon B. Johnson.
- Evacuation of the Indian state of Assam began as troops from China invaded India in the course of the Sino-Indian War. Residents of East Pakistan (now Bangladesh) prepared for a probable Chinese takeover as well. Rather than conquering Assam, however, China would later withdraw its forces.
- U.S. President Kennedy signed Executive Order 11063, directing an end to discrimination in public housing that received any federal assistance. However, the order was prospective only and did not apply to "low income units built or planned before November 20, 1962".
- Thai educator and writer Mom Luang Pin Malakul was awarded the West German Federal Cross of Merit, and the Belgian Order of Leopold.
- Died: John Alden, 54, Australian actor and Shakespearean director; of a coronary occlusion

== November 11, 1962 (Sunday) ==
- The first constitution for Kuwait was approved by the Emir, Abdullah III Al-Salim Al-Sabah, providing for an elected unicameral parliament of 50 members, an executive rule by "the descendants of the late Mubarak Al-Sabah", and specifying, in Article 2, that in the absence of specific legislation, the Sharia Islamic law was to govern the emirate's jurisprudence.
- The French ship Jean Gougy ran aground at Land's End, Cornwall, United Kingdom and capsized. Eight of the twenty crew were rescued by helicopter or breeches buoy. Sergeant Eric Smith of 22 Squadron, Royal Air Force would be awarded a George Medal for his actions in the rescue.
- Article 14 of the Indian Constitution, the right to equal protection of the laws, was suspended by Presidential order as part of the Defence of India Ordinance. The suspension of constitutional rights under Articles 15, 21 and 22 would remain in effect until January 1969.
- Born: Demi Moore (stage name for Demetria Guynes), American actress; in Roswell, New Mexico

== November 12, 1962 (Monday) ==
- U.S. Attorney General Robert F. Kennedy attended a reception for the visiting Bolshoi Ballet troupe at the Soviet Embassy in Washington, and passed along a verbal message from U.S. President Kennedy to Soviet Ambassador Anatoly Dobrynin, to send to Soviet Premier and Party Chairman Nikita Khrushchev. In return for the USSR announcing plans to remove their Ilyushin Il-28 bombers from Cuba over a 30-day period, President Kennedy said, the U.S. would end its blockade.
- Two hand surgeons, Dr. Harold E. Kleinert and Dr. Mort Kasdan, performed the first successful revascularization of a severed digit (in this case, a partially amputated thumb) on a human patient, reconnecting the dorsal veins in order to restore function to the hand. The procedure took place at the University of Louisville hospital.
- Born:
  - Mariella Frostrup, Norwegian journalist and television presenter; in Oslo
  - Naomi Wolf, American author and political consultant; in San Francisco

== November 13, 1962 (Tuesday) ==
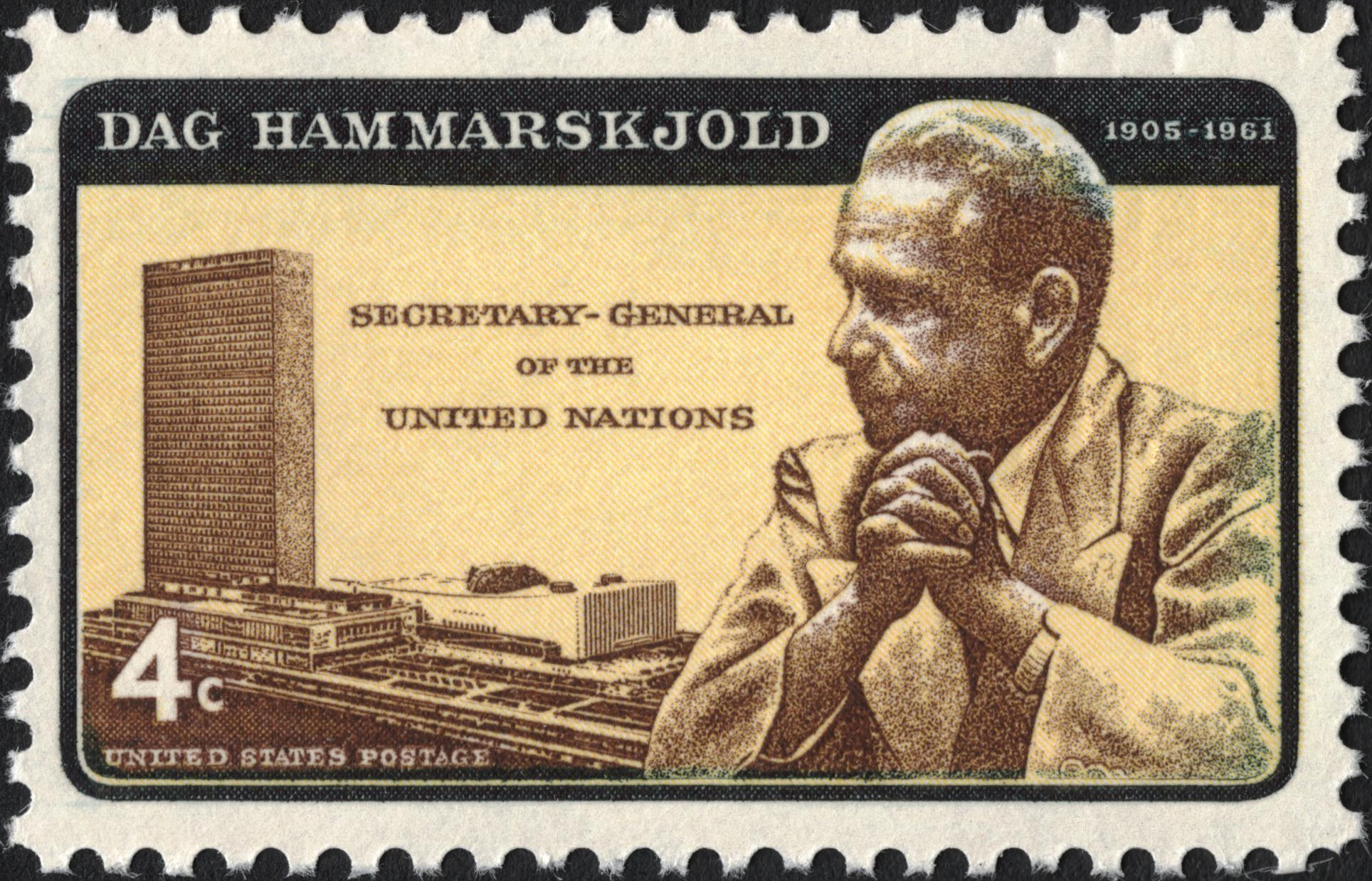
The original stamp

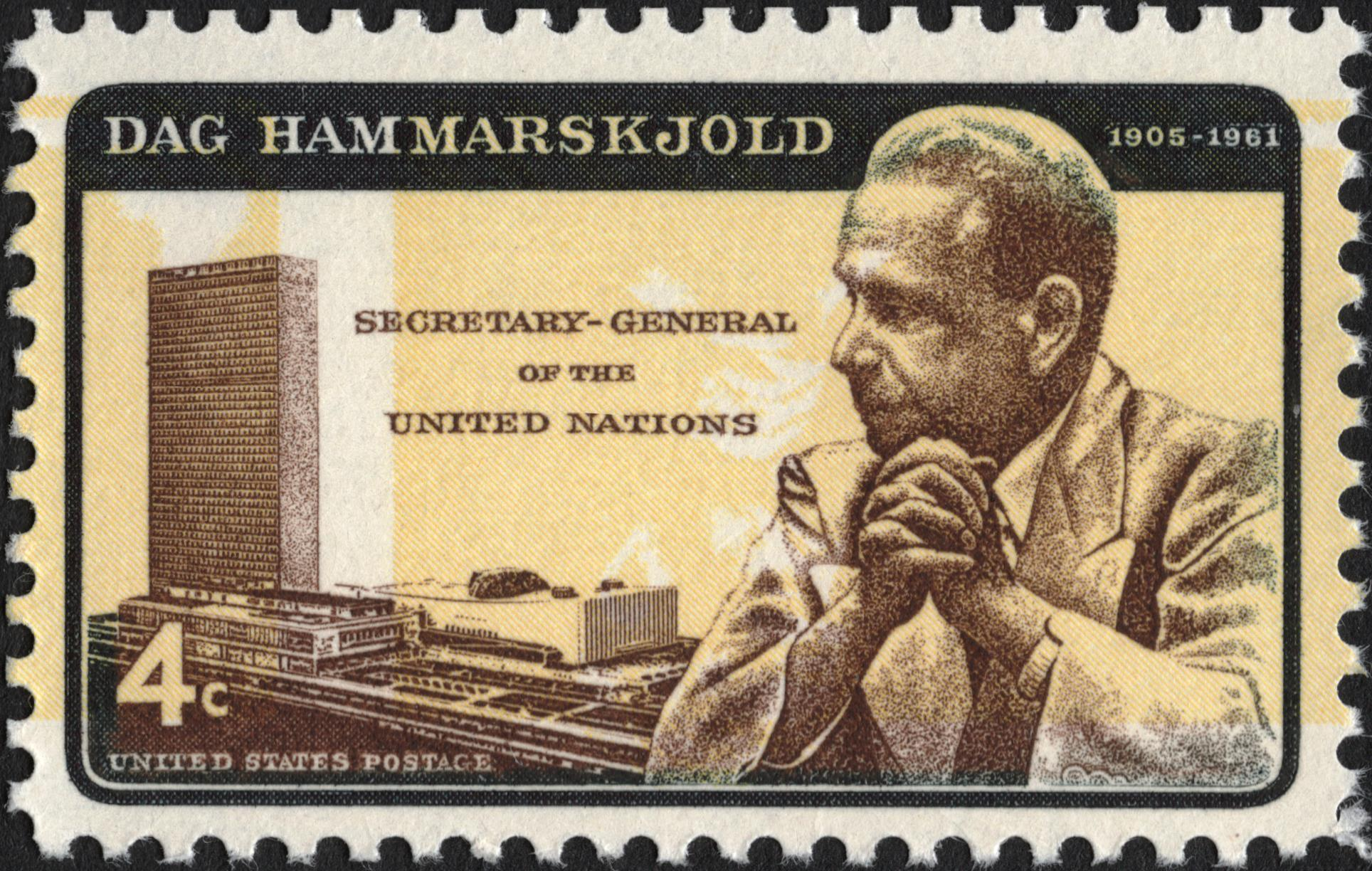
The deliberate misprint

- After American philatelists discovered a rare printing error, known to collectors now as the Dag Hammarskjöld invert, that affected 400 of the hundreds of thousands of four-cent commemorative stamps, U.S. Postmaster General J. Edward Day ordered 400,000 identical misprints in order to reduce the value of the original goofs, and commented, "The Post Office Department isn't run as a jackpot operation." The mistake, which had changed the background on two sheets of 200 stamps, had been the first by the U.S. Post Office in 44 years and made each 4-cent issue worth as much as 350 dollars to collectors. Collector Leonard Sherman, who had purchased an unbroken sheet of 50 inverts, saw a potential fortune of $175,000 get deflated to $2.
- For the first time since the 7th century AD, a new name was added to the Canon of the Mass of the Roman Catholic Church, as Pope John XXIII added Saint Joseph, the earthly father of Jesus Christ, to the list of people venerated in the Communicantes.
- Gordon Cooper was named as the pilot for the Mercury 9 one-day orbital mission slated for April 1963. Alan Shepard, pilot of Mercury 3, was designated as backup pilot.
- The B. F. Goodrich Company completed its design, fabrication, and testing of a pivoted light attenuation tinted visor to be mounted on the government-issued Mercury spacesuit helmet.
- Born: Lydia Gouardo, a French woman who was imprisoned for 28 years, raped, and tortured by her stepfather, Raymond Gouardo; in Maisons-Alfort, Val-de-Marne
- Died: Baron Stasys Šilingas, 77, Lithuanian lawyer and statesman

== November 14, 1962 (Wednesday) ==
- Eritrea, for ten years an autonomous unit that was part of a federation with Ethiopia, lost its independence as it was annexed as the 14th province of the Ethiopian Empire. With a force of Ethiopian soldiers outside the Eritrean Assembly building in the region's capital, Asmara, the Eritrean administrator, Asfaha Woldemichael, urged the Assembly to pass a resolution to unite with the "Motherland". The next day, Ethiopia's Emperor Haile Selassie issued Order No. 27, citing the unanimous approval of the Assembly. After another 18 years of war, Eritrea would regain its independence in 1991.
- At about 1:30 a.m., the southeast door of the Salt Lake Temple of the Church of Jesus Christ of Latter-day Saints (LDS Church), located on Temple Square in Salt Lake City, Utah, was bombed. FBI agents stated that the explosive had been wrapped around the door handles on the southeast entrance of the temple. The large wooden entrance doors were damaged by flying fragments of metal and glass, and eleven exterior windows were shattered. Damage to interior walls occurred 25 feet (7.6 m) inside the temple, but damage to the interior was minor.
- In the Quebec general election, the Quebec Liberal Party, led by provincial premier Jean Lesage, increased its majority from 51 to 63 of the 95 seats.

== November 15, 1962 (Thursday) ==
- Archie Moore, who had reigned as boxing's world light heavyweight champion between 1952 and 1962, fought unbeaten challenger Cassius Clay (later Muhammad Ali) in Los Angeles. Clay, who had gained a reputation as "the Louisville Lip who calls the round for a knockout and makes it come true", predicted that he would win in four rounds and knocked Moore out in the fourth.
- The Greek freighter Captain George, with a cargo of explosives, caught fire during a storm while sailing in the Caribbean Sea near Bermuda. The crew of 25 abandoned the ship and boarded a lifeboat, which capsized after being battered by 45-foot (14 m) high waves.
- Danish Defence Minister Poul Hansen resigned in order to replace the late Hans R. Knudsen as Denmark's Minister of Finance.
- Died: Irene Gibbons, 60, American film costume designer. Mrs. Gibbons, who billed herself simply as "Irene", checked into Room 1129 of the Knickerbocker Hotel in Los Angeles, drank heavily, wrote a suicide note and then jumped to her death.

== November 16, 1962 (Friday) ==
- Tipped off by an anonymous letter to French Cultural Affairs Minister Andre Malraux, police went to a barn at Villiers-Saint-Georges and recovered 56 paintings that had been stolen on July 16, 1961. The works, taken from the Annonciade museum in Saint-Tropez, were hidden under a pile of hay and were valued at $2.2 million. The thieves, who apparently were unable to sell the masterpieces anywhere, left a message saying, "We beg forgiveness for having stolen these works of art. By giving them back we hope our crime will be forgotten."
- The Russian-language literary magazine Novy Mir published part of the novel One Day in the Life of Ivan Denisovich, by Aleksandr Solzhenitsyn, with the support of Soviet Communist Party Chairman Khrushchev, giving hope to authors that government censorship of literature in the USSR would be eased.
- SA-3, an uncrewed craft in the Apollo program, was launched by the U.S. from Cape Canaveral Air Force Station Launch Complex 34 and destroyed five minutes later, as part of an experiment code-named Project Highwater.
- The Manned Spacecraft Center presented the U.S. Department of Defense with recovery and network support requirements for the Mercury 9 mission. Mercury spacecraft No. 15A was delivered to Cape Canaveral for the Mercury 10 three-day mission planned for 1963. However, that mission would be canceled after the success of the Mercury 9 launch.
- The Detroit trolleybus system went out of service, for the second and last time.
- Born: Gary "Mani" Mounfield, English bass guitarist for The Stone Roses; in Manchester

== November 17, 1962 (Saturday) ==
- Nine people were killed in the capsizing of the British Seaham life-boat George Elmey as it was entering harbour after rescuing the crew of a fishing boat. All five crew and four of the five fishing boat survivors were killed.
- At Chantilly, Virginia, 26 miles (42 km) from Washington, D.C., U.S. President Kennedy dedicated Dulles International Airport, named after the late U.S. Secretary of State John Foster Dulles.
- A fire broke out in a chamber at the U.S. Navy's Air Crew Equipment Laboratory during a pure oxygen test, after a faulty ground wire arced onto nearby insulation. After trying to extinguish the fire by smothering it, the crew escaped the chamber with minor burns across large parts of their bodies.
- The Alabama Crimson Tide, the #1 ranked college football team in the U.S. lost, 7–6, to the Georgia Tech Yellowjackets, 7–6, bringing to an end a 19-game winning streak.
- Died:
  - Arthur Vining Davis, 95, American multimillionaire philanthropist and former chairman of the Aluminum Company of America (Alcoa); he had retired in 1957 as the third-richest person in the world with assets of $400 million, comparable to $3.2 billion in 2017.
  - Olivia Dahl, 7, oldest child of British author Roald Dahl and the American actress Patricia Neal; from encephalitis caused by measles

== November 18, 1962 (Sunday) ==
- The first round of voting took place for the 482 seats in France's Chamber of Deputies, with 96 of the candidates winning a majority of the votes in their races, including 45 of Charles De Gaulle's UNR Party. The remaining 386 seats would be decided in the second round on November 25, with only a plurality of the votes required.
- After a three-week pause during the Sino-Indian War in China's offensive on the Indian frontier to allow reinforcement and buildup of troops, a second and more massive invasion began, with Chinese troops overrunning Indian positions in the Indian state of Assam.
- The explosion and sinking of the Greek liberty ship Captain George killed 18 of its 31 crew. The 13 survivors were rescued by a British ship.
- Born:
  - Kirk Hammett, American guitarist and songwriter in the heavy metal band Metallica; in San Francisco
  - Jamie Moyer, American baseball player; in Sellersville, Pennsylvania

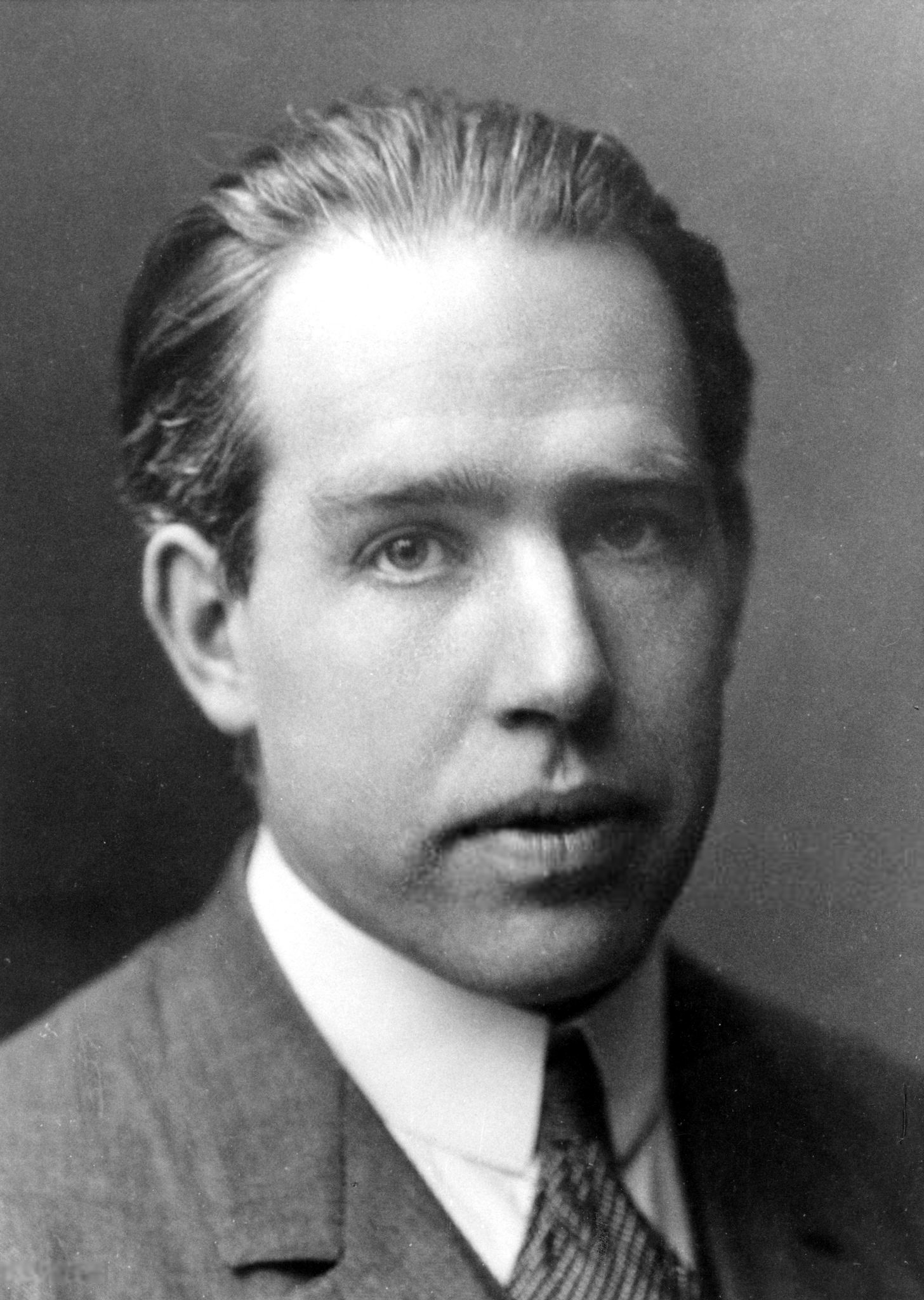
Bohr

- Died:
  - Niels Bohr, 77, Danish physicist and Nobel laureate. Element 107, bohrium, is named in his honor
  - Dennis Chavez, 74, Hispanic American politician and U.S. Senator for New Mexico since 1935

== November 19, 1962 (Monday) ==
- A message in Morse code was transmitted from EPR (Evpatoria Planetary Radar) in the Soviet Union, directed at the planet Venus and using the second planet "as a passive reflector". The "message", however, was simply the Russian word "Mir" (МИР) which can refer to the Earth, or to peace. The medium was to repeat a pattern of signals of 30 seconds for "dash" and 10 seconds for "dot" (— —)(· ·)(· — ·).
- The Newfoundland general election was won by the Liberal Party of Newfoundland and Labrador, led by Joey Smallwood.
- Born:
  - Jodie Foster, American actress and film director, twice winner of Academy Award for Best Actress; as Alicia Christian Foster in Los Angeles
  - Amado Boudou, Vice President of Argentina from 2011 to 2015; in Buenos Aires

== November 20, 1962 (Tuesday) ==
- Two days after launching an offensive that threatened to overrun northeast India, China suddenly announced a unilateral ceasefire in the Sino-Indian War, effective at midnight local time, and ordered that by December 1, its troops would withdraw 20 kilometres (12 mi) behind the "line of actual control" that had existed three years earlier.
- János Kádár, Prime Minister of Hungary and General Secretary of the Hungarian Socialist Workers' Party, announced a general amnesty, effective March 21, 1963, for all persons who participated in the 1956 Hungarian Revolution.
- In response to the Soviet Union having removed its missiles and announcing that it would remove its Il-28 bombers from Cuba, President John F. Kennedy ended the U.S. quarantine proclaimed during the Cuban Missile Crisis.

== November 21, 1962 (Wednesday) ==
- The U.S. Federal Communications Commission issued the All-Channel Receiver Act, an order directing that all television sets manufactured in or imported into the United States, on or after April 30, 1964, had to be "all-channel equipped", to receive UHF channels 14 through 83 in addition to VHF channels 2 through 13.
- McDonnell Aircraft Corporation and the Manned Spacecraft Center terminated McDonnell's subcontract, with the CTL Division of Studebaker, for the backup Gemini heatshield. The decision came after CTL's problems in fabricating heat shield No. 1, and the success of a new McDonnell design.
- Born: Igor Škamperle, Slovenian mountaineer, sociologist and writer; in Trieste, Italy
- Died: Sao Shwe Thaik, 68, first president of the Union of Burma and the last Saopha of Yawnghwe

== November 22, 1962 (Thursday) ==
- A mob of at least 100 black South African members of the terrorist group Poqo (and perhaps as many as 250) marched from the township of Mbekweni and into white neighborhoods in the city of Paarl. Armed with machetes and clubs, the group surrounded the police station, while others entered homes at random, and attacked residents in the early morning hours, while others vandalized storefronts in the downtown.
- In the UK, the Chippenham by-election, caused by the elevation of MP David Eccles to the House of Lords, was won by Daniel Awdry of the Conservative Party.
- Died: René Coty, 80, 17th President of France from 1954 to 1959

== November 23, 1962 (Friday) ==
- All 17 people on board United Airlines Flight 297 were killed by a bird strike when a Vickers Viscount 754D flew into a flock of whistling swans while making its approach to Washington, D.C., and crashed north of Ellicott City, Maryland. One of the swans collided with the left horizontal stabilizer on the tail section, causing the plane to go out of control and into the ground.

== November 24, 1962 (Saturday) ==
- The first episode of the influential British satire show That Was The Week That Was was broadcast on BBC Television.
- General elections were held in Jordan, where all political parties were banned at the time.

== November 25, 1962 (Sunday) ==
- The second round of voting for France's Chamber of Deputies took place, as President De Gaulle's UNR party won 188 of the remaining 386 seats still contested, giving the UNR a total of 233 seats in the 482 seat Chamber, 8 short of a majority. With the support of at least 30 other candidates from other parties, the UNR had enough to form a coalition government.
- Voting was held for the parliament of the West German state of Bavaria. The Christian Social Union in Bavaria (CSU) achieved an absolute majority of seats for the first time since 1946 under newly elected Minister-President Alfons Goppel.

== November 26, 1962 (Monday) ==
- German police ended their occupation of the offices of the West German weekly news magazine, Der Spiegel, bringing an end to the "Spiegel affair".
- The Beatles made their definitive recording of "Please Please Me" at EMI Studios in London with George Martin as the producer of the song.
- Mies Bouwman started presenting the first live telethon (a TV marathon fundraising show) in the Netherlands, Open Het Dorp ("Open the Village"). The show would last for 23 hours without a stop before concluding after it raised 21 million guilders, equivalent to $8.4 million U.S. dollars, worth $88 million or €84 million in 2025.

== November 27, 1962 (Tuesday) ==
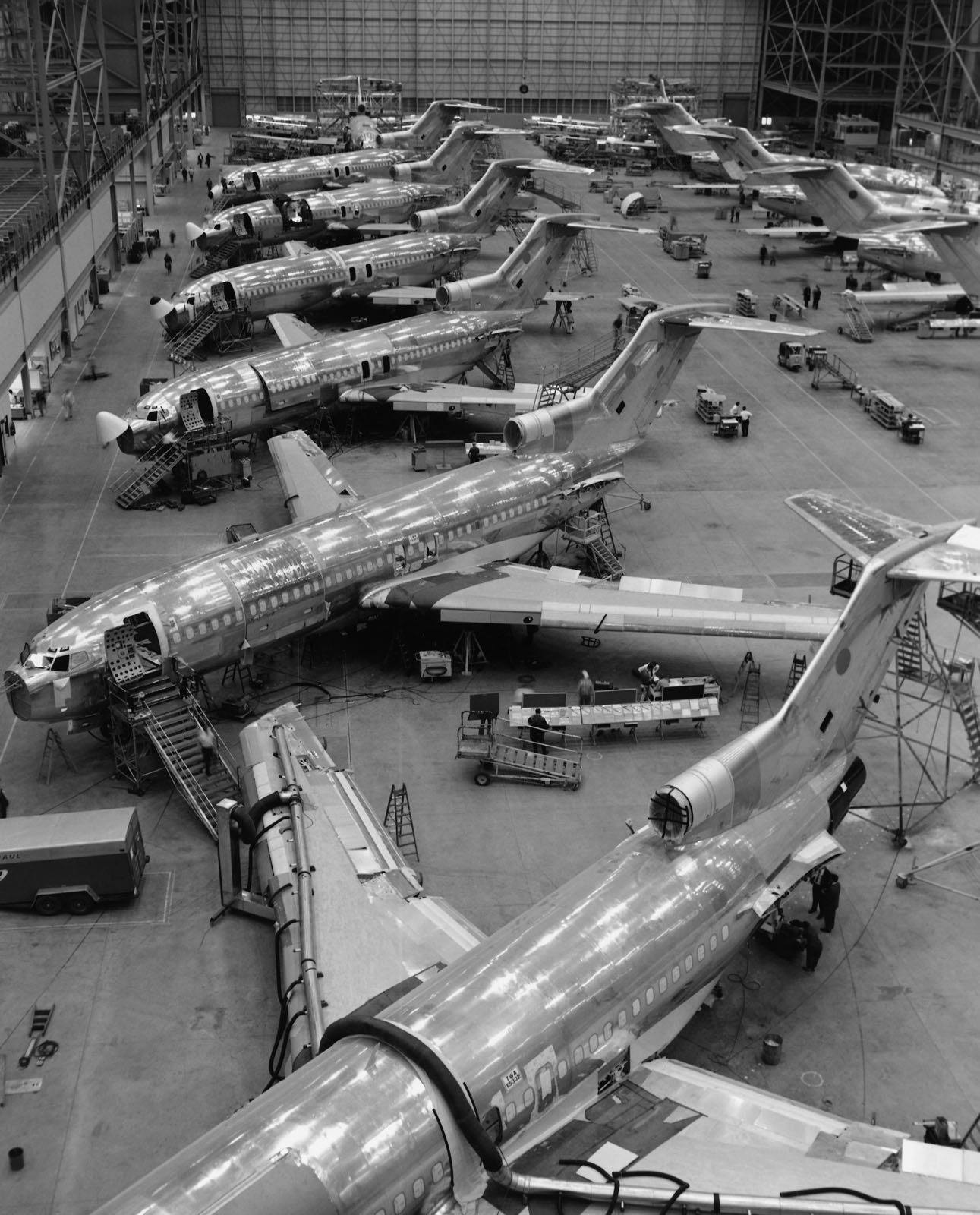
Boeing 727 production

- The first Boeing 727 was rolled out from its hangar in Seattle, and would be flown for the first time on February 9, 1963, with Eastern Airlines putting it into commercial service a year later.
- French President Charles De Gaulle ordered Prime Minister Georges Pompidou to form a new government.
- Born: Emma Walton Hamilton, British-American children's book author, theatrical director, and actress; in London, as the daughter of singer and actress Julie Andrews and set/costume designer Tony Walton

== November 28, 1962 (Wednesday) ==
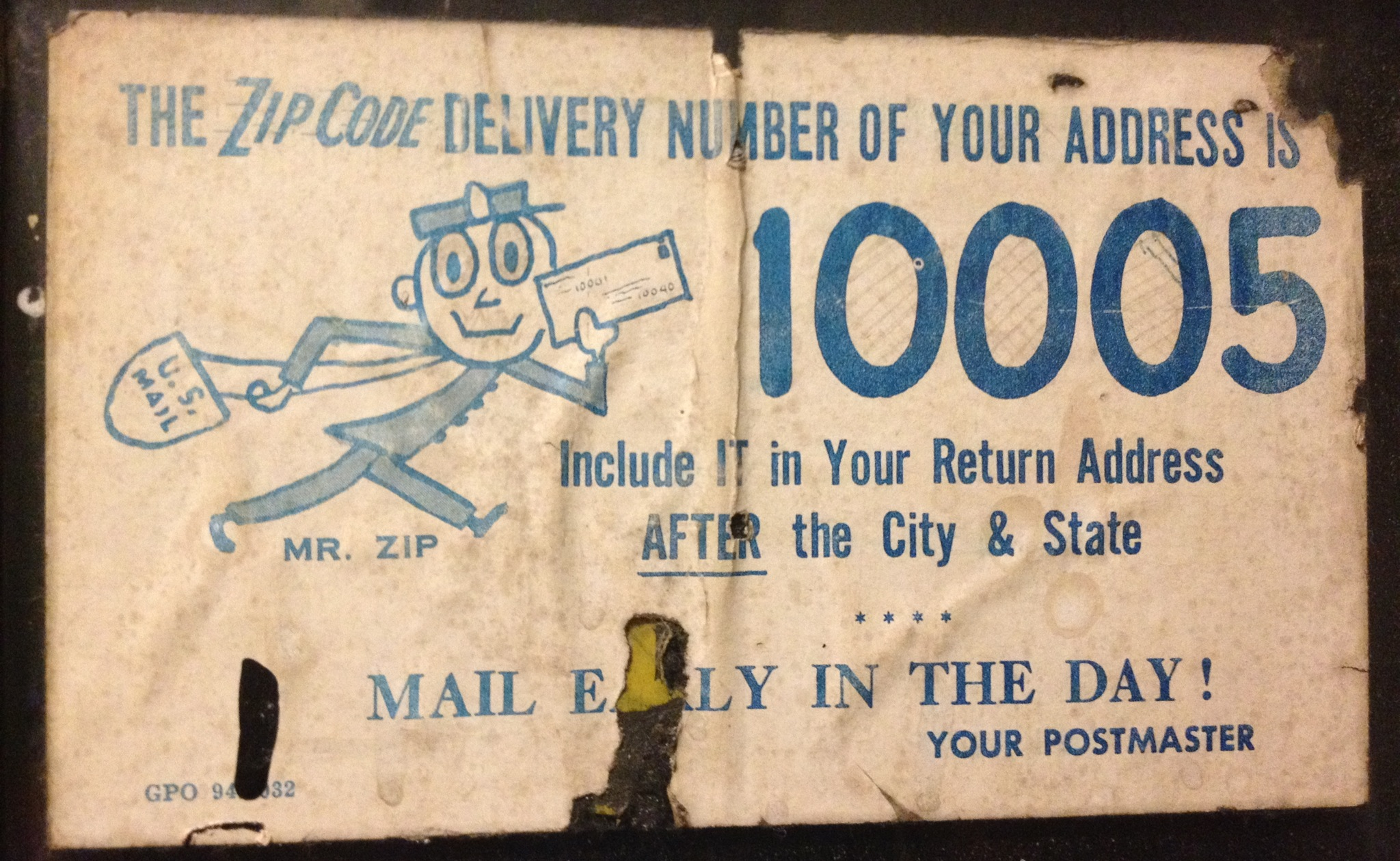
The "Zip Code" introduced

- U.S. Postmaster General J. Edward Day announced the "Zoning Improvement Plan" that would implement a five-digit number identifying each post office in the United States, beginning on July 1, 1963. The "ZIP Code" was initially intended for businesses that had high speed electronic data sorters, but Day said that use by private citizens would not be mandatory, noting that "We're not too concerned if Aunt Minnie doesn't put the numbers on her letter."
- At the U.S. Embassy in Tokyo, Japanese artist Yoko Ono married fellow-artist Anthony Cox. At the time, the future wife of John Lennon was also married to (but separated from) composer Toshi Ichiyanagi, causing Ono to temporarily be in a state of bigamy that would be fixed by an annulment of the marriage to Cox, a divorce from Toshi, and a remarriage with Cox.
- The United States Armed Forces returned its defense readiness condition to DEFCON 4 after having been at DEFCON 2 since October 23 during the start of the Cuban Missile Crisis.
- Mrs. Vijaya Lakshmi Pandit, sister of India's Prime Minister Jawaharlal Nehru, became Governor of the state of Maharashtra.
- Born: Jon Stewart (stage name for Jonathan Stuart Leibowitz), American comedian and host of The Daily Show; in New York City

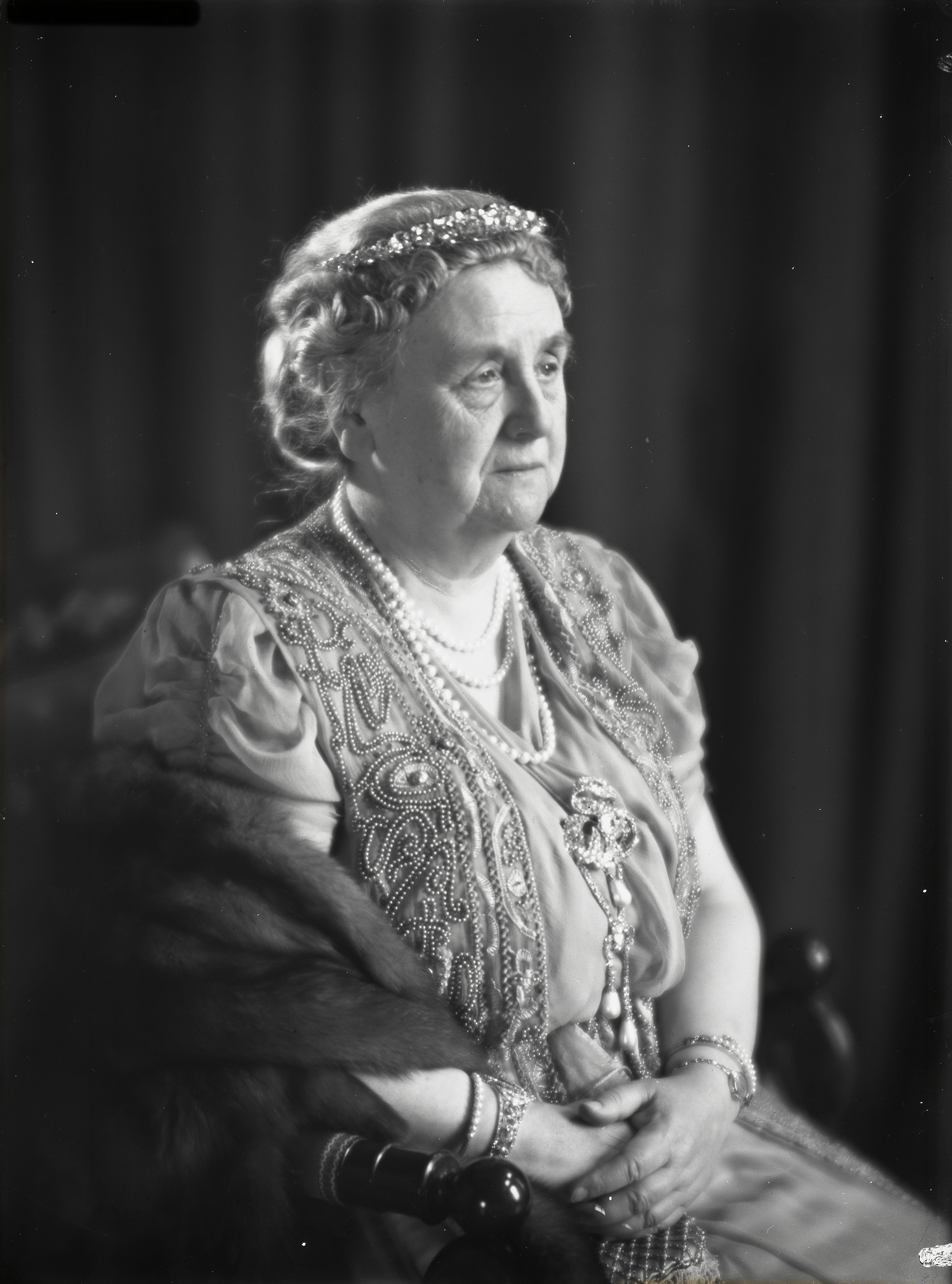
Queen Wilhelmina

- Died: Queen Wilhelmina of the Netherlands, 82, who reigned from 1890 to 1948 before abdicating in favor of her daughter, Juliana

== November 29, 1962 (Thursday) ==
- Britain and France signed an agreement to develop the Concorde supersonic airliner. Only 14 would ever enter service.
- Died: Erik Scavenius, 85, former Prime Minister of Denmark

== November 30, 1962 (Friday) ==
- Franz Josef Strauss was forced to resign as West Germany's Defence Minister. Strauss was relieved of his duties as a result of the "Spiegel affair", after being accused of ordering police action against the staff of the magazine Der Spiegel.
- The crash of Eastern Air Lines Flight 512 killed 25 of the 51 people on board, after the Douglas DC-7B, crashed while trying to land in heavy fog at Idlewild Airport in New York City.
- Gemini Project Office reported its revision of plans for implementing the preflight checkout of the Gemini spacecraft at Cape Canaveral. .
- Born: Vincent "Bo" Jackson, American MLB baseball (Kansas City Royals) and NFL football (Los Angeles Raiders) player known for being the only professional athlete in history to be named an All-Star in two major North American sports; in Bessemer, Alabama
