= Per-Erik Burud =

Norwegian billionaire (1962–2011)

- Born: 15 October 1962; Drammen, Norway
- Died: 13 July 2011 (aged 48) near Tjøme, Norway
- Occupation: Businesses
- Known for: Head of the grocery chain Kiwi

Per-Erik Burud (15 October 1962 – 13 July 2011) was a Norwegian billionaire and head of the grocery chain Kiwi. He joined Kiwi in 1991, and by 2007 he was Norway's 134th richest man with a fortune of NOK 1.1 billion.

== Early life ==
As a five-year-old, Burud worked in his father's shop in Drammen, sorting bottles and wrapping clementines. He later went to business school, and was also an active gymnast.

== Kiwi ==
Burud bought a share post in Kiwi in 1991, when the chain had eight stores. During Burud's time in charge of the grocery chain it has expanded, and by 2008 had almost quadrupled the number of employees and stores, and increased revenues six-fold. In 2007 the chain had 413 stores. In 2011 the chain had 450 stores, 8,000 employees and the company had a turnover of NOK 20 billion.

Burud was known for his use of inventive marketing campaigns. In 2000, Burud started a campaign in which the chain gave away every fifth pack of diapers for free. The agreement was the start of a fierce price competition in the Norwegian market for diapers. At the same time a campaign started in which the stores promised the customer the item for free if they discovered items that had reached their expiration date. In 2007, Burud launched a campaign against the value added tax on fruit and vegetables, in which the group covered the VAT on 14 percent of all fresh fruits and vegetables, and he challenged the authorities to make the tax cut permanent.

== Boating accident ==
On 13 July 2011, Burud was reported missing after a boating accident outside Tjøme, where his wife was confirmed dead. The police declared on the evening of 13 July that they assumed Burud was dead. After several days of intensive search, on 21 July the body of a man was found in the area where Burud went missing. The next day the man was identified as Burud.
