= Kiwi (store) =

Norwegian supermarket chain

Kiwi Minipris
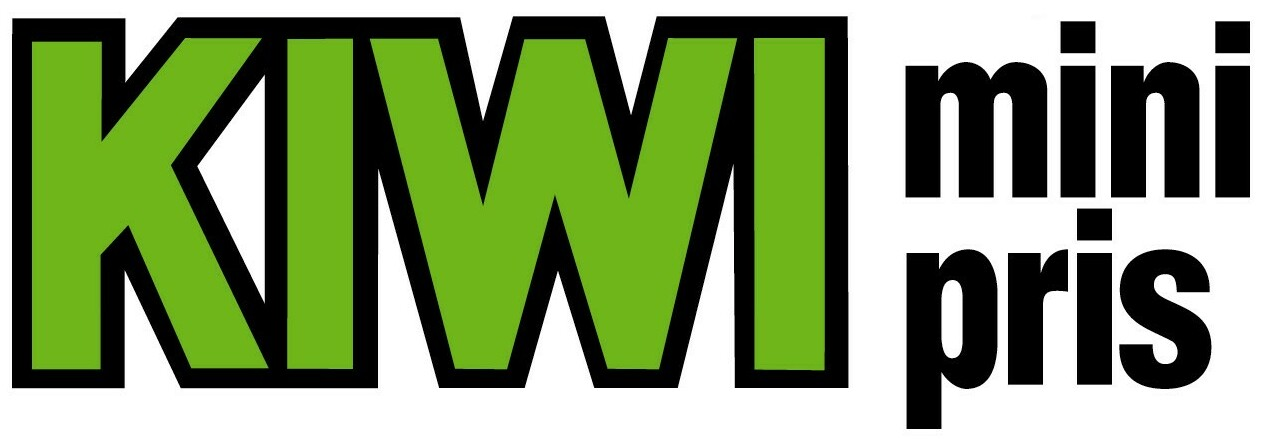
- Type: Supermarket
- Founded: 1979
- Founder: Per-Erik Burud
- Number of locations: 690
- Area served: Norway
- Brands: First Price
- Revenue: 1.425 billion NOK €141 million (2022)
- Owner: NorgesGruppen
- Number of employees: 14 000
- Website: www.kiwi.no

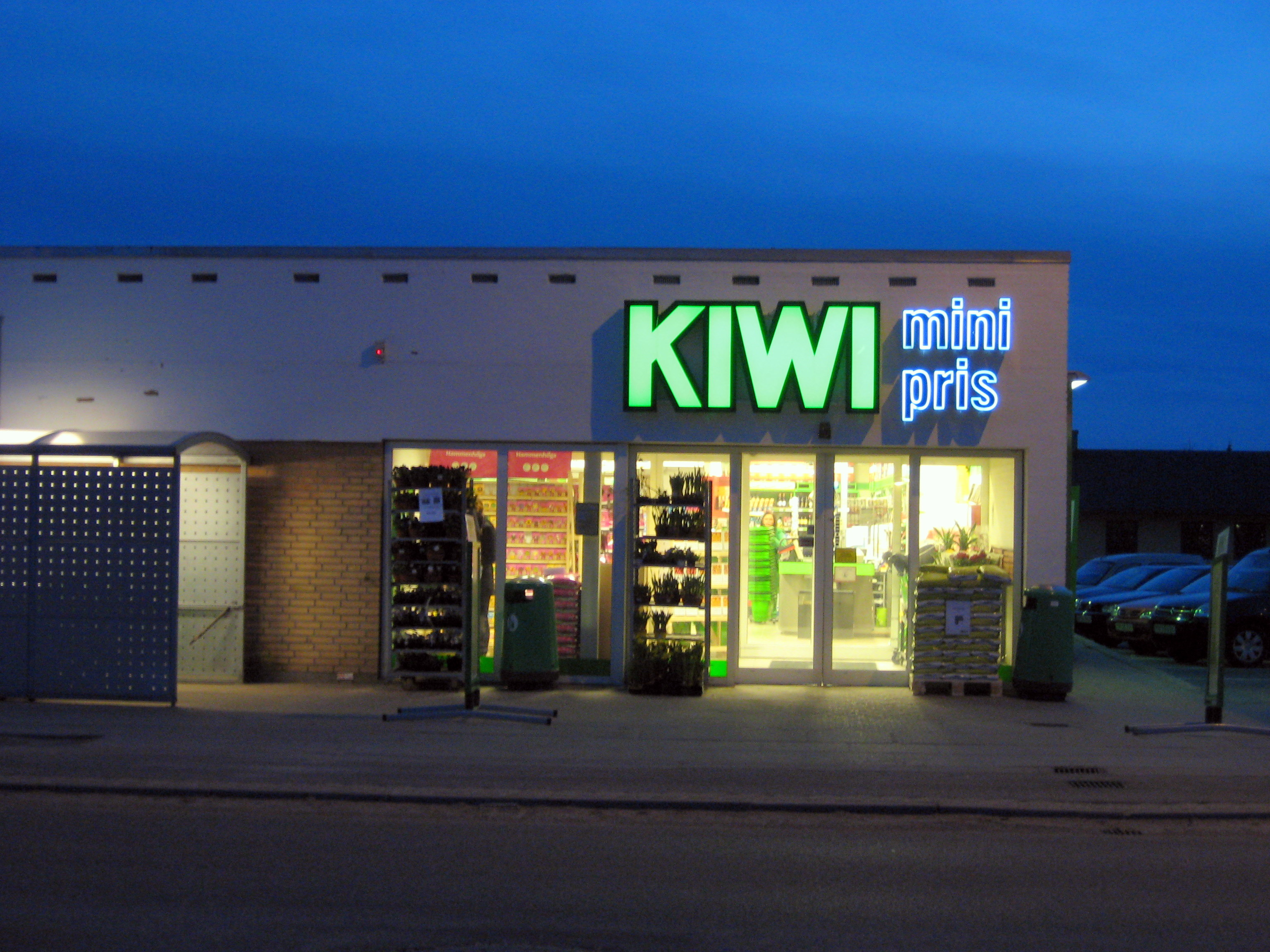
KIWI in Hjørring Denmark

Kiwi Minipris also known as just Kiwi (stylised as KIWI) is a Norwegian supermarket chain that has over 700 retail outlets in Norway. Kiwi has about 14,000 employees. In addition to premium brands it also carries the private label First Price. In Denmark, Kiwi was a joint venture between NorgesGruppen and Dagrofa.

Kiwi was owned and operated by Norwegian businessman Per-Erik Burud. After Burud's death, Jan Paul Bjørkøy was constituted as new leader of the chain.

The company is a participant in the Nøkkellhullsmerket ("keyhole mark") program. This is an initiative backed by health and nutrition institutions throughout Sweden, Denmark, and Norway, which aims to mark certain food items as healthy.

Kiwi is an official sponsor of the Norway national football team.

== Kiwi Denmark ==
In Denmark, Kiwi primarily operated in Jutland and Funen. It had only two stores in other locations. In June 2010 it opened its first store in the capital region. It was located in the Østerbro region of Copenhagen.

In April 2017 it was announced that all stores in Denmark would cease to operate under the Kiwi brand. Thirty stores would continue under the SPAR or Meny brands.
