= December 1962 =

Month of 1962

<<	December 1962					>>
Su	Mo	Tu	We	Th	Fr	Sa
						1
2	3	4	5	6	7	8
9	10	11	12	13	14	15
16	17	18	19	20	21	22
23	24	25	26	27	28	29
30	31

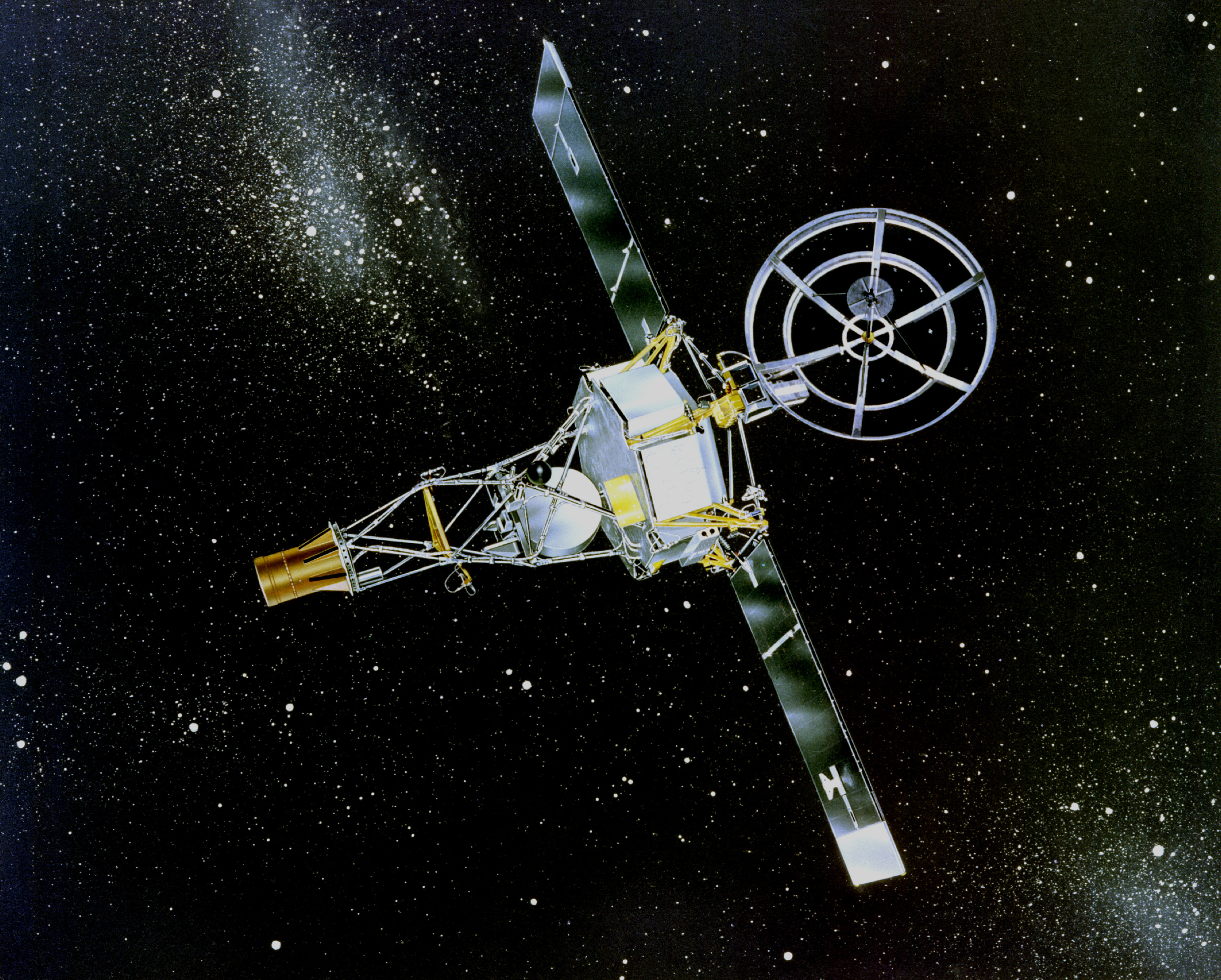
December 14, 1962: Mariner 2 transmits information from Venus to Earth

December 19, 1962: Mona Lisa arrives in the United States

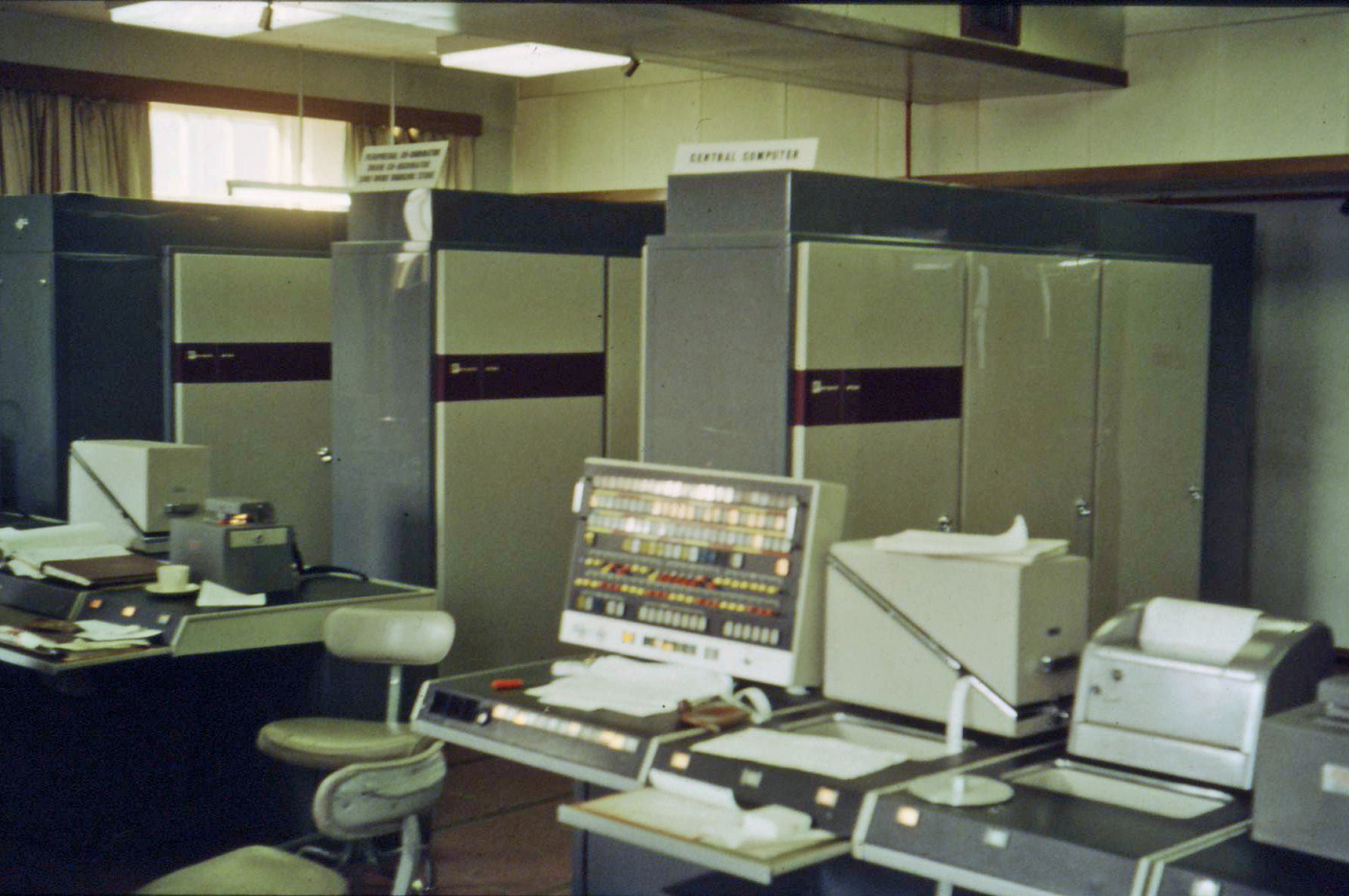
December 7, 1962: ATLAS, the most powerful computer up to that time, goes online

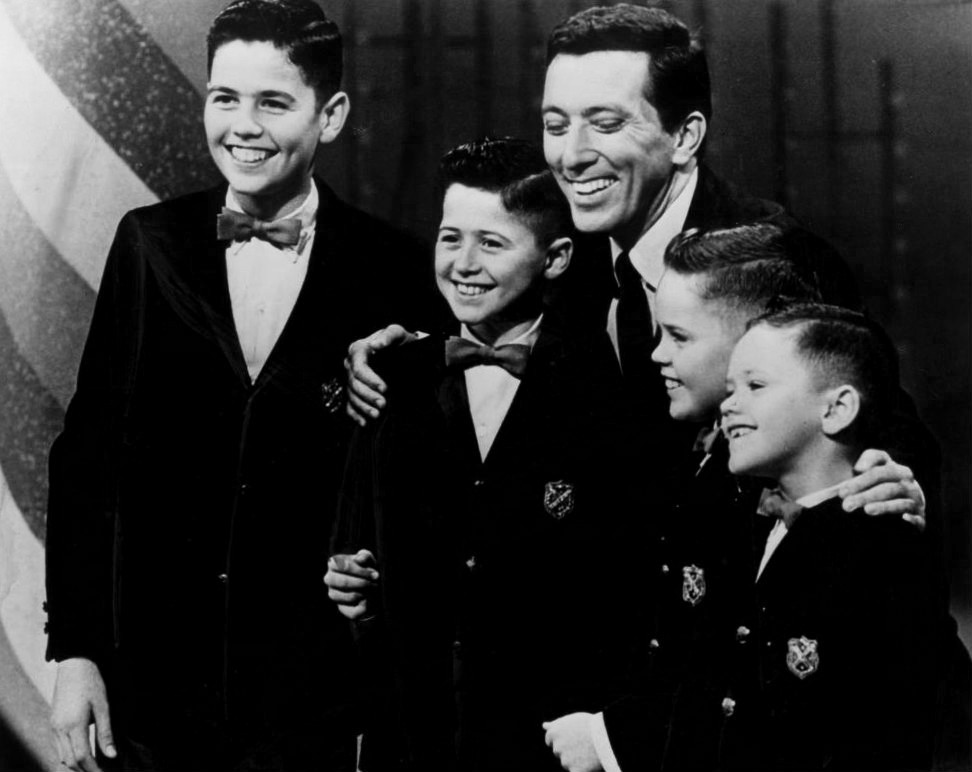
December 20, 1962: The Osmond Brothers make their national debut with Andy Williams

The following events occurred in December 1962:

== December 1, 1962 (Saturday) ==
- Ipswich Town F.C. scored a 2–0 upset win over Sheffield Wednesday F.C. in an English soccer football match that would turn out to have been fixed. On April 12, 1965, The People, a London tabloid newspaper, would break the story that three of the Sheffield players, including a national team player, Peter Swan, had bet on their team to lose, and had made a £100 profit. Swan, along with Tony Kay and David "Bronco" Layne would be among 10 players sentenced to prison in 1965, and would serve four months' incarceration.
- The 1962 Grey Cup, championship of the Canadian Football League, was played at Toronto's Exhibition Stadium between the Winnipeg Blue Bombers and the Hamilton Tiger-Cats before a crowd of 32,644. As the game progressed, a thick fog rolled onto the field, making visibility increasingly difficult, and with 9:29 left to play, and Winnipeg leading 28–27, the game was halted. The remaining nine-and-one-half minutes were played the next day, with no further scoring and Winnipeg winning the crown.
- The 1963 American Football League draft took place, with Buck Buchanan of Grambling being the first selection, made by the Dallas Texans.
- The 1962 British Empire and Commonwealth Games came to an end, in Perth, Western Australia.
- Ron Ashman became manager of UK soccer club Norwich City F.C.
- Died: Joseph C. O'Mahoney, 78, U.S. Senator from Wyoming from 1934 to 1953 and again from 1954 to 1961

== December 2, 1962 (Sunday) ==
- A week of severe smog began in London, killing at least 106 people over four days, and causing the hospitalization of over 1,000. Most of the people whose deaths were blamed on the fog had pre-existing heart and lung problems, with 66 dead in the first three days. In 1952, the combination of factory pollution and fog had killed at least 4,000 people over nine days.
- After a trip to Vietnam at the request of U.S. President John F. Kennedy, U.S. Senate Majority Leader Mike Mansfield became the first American official to make a non-optimistic public comment on the progress of the Vietnam War.
- In Japan, Toru Terasawa won the annual Fukuoka Marathon in a Japanese national record time of 2:16:18.4.

== December 3, 1962 (Monday) ==
- The USC Trojans, unbeaten and untied at 10–0–0, were voted the #1 college football team in the final AP and UPI polls, with the Wisconsin Badgers second. At the time, no polls were taken after the post-season bowl games, making USC the champion listed in the NCAA Football Guide. USC proved the polls right during the Rose Bowl a month later, when it beat the #2 ranked Wisconsin Badgers, 42 to 37.
- A decree from the Roman Catholic Church confirmed that Saint Patrick (387–493) was the patron saint of Ireland. Saint Brigid of Kildare (452–524) was named as the second patron.
- In the NFL draft, quarterback and Heisman Trophy winner Terry Baker of Oregon State University was the number one overall pick, selected by the Los Angeles Rams.
- The Canadian cities of Ottawa and Toronto held municipal elections. Metro Toronto held two referendums on the same day.
- The French Chamber of Deputies approved the new government of Prime Minister Georges Pompidou, 268–116.
- Died: Mary Gilmore, 97, Australian poet and journalist

== December 4, 1962 (Tuesday) ==
- Seven people, a majority of whom were with the Manned Spacecraft Center, were set to win monetary awards for inventions that were important in the development of Project Mercury. These were: Andre J. Meyer, Jr. ($1,000) for the vehicle parachute and equipment jettison equipment; Maxime Faget and Andre Meyer (divided $1,500) for the emergency ejection device; Maxime Faget, William Bland, and Jack Heberlig (divided $2,000) for the survival couch; and Maxime Faget, Andre Meyer, Robert Chilton, Williard Blanchard, Alan Kehlet, Jerome Hammack, and Caldwell Johnson (divided $4,200) for the Mercury spacecraft design. Formal presentation of these awards was made on December 10, 1962.
- The first Jacob's Awards ceremony was held in Dublin, marking the first awards for achievement in Irish television. Winners included Joe Lynch, Charles Mitchel and Proinsias Mac Aonghusa.
- Died: Pietro Tomasi Della Torretta, 89, former Foreign Minister of Italy (1921–1922), later the last President of the Senate of the Kingdom of Italy (1944–1946)

== December 5, 1962 (Wednesday) ==
- Former U.S. Secretary of State Dean Rusk "delivered a speech so brutally honest that he has never been forgiven for it", in the words of one commentator, declaring that "Great Britain has lost an empire and has not yet found a role... The attempt to play a separate power role... based on being the head of a 'Commonwealth' which has no political structure, unity or strength... this role is absolutely played out." Rusk delivered his criticism of the United Kingdom in a speech before cadets at the United States Military Academy at West Point.
- The body of 20-year-old Sophie Clark was found strangled in Boston's Back Bay, making her the seventh victim of the Boston Strangler.
- The first Test match of the 1962–63 Ashes series ended in a draw at Brisbane Cricket Ground.
- The Tasmanian blue gum was adopted as an official symbol of the Australian state of Tasmania.
- Born: José Cura, Argentine operatic tenor; in Rosario
- Died: Arthur Murray, 3rd Viscount Elibank, 83, British MP and the last of the Viscounts Elibank

== December 6, 1962 (Thursday) ==
- The space program of the People's Republic of China suffered a setback when 200 kilograms (440 lb) of a solid rocket fuel mixture exploded during preparation, killing four technicians.
- An explosion killed 37 coal miners at the U.S. Steel Corporation's Robena #3 mine near Carmichaels, Pennsylvania, most of them suffocating from carbon monoxide gas.
- A Tecader Airlines Douglas C-47 airplane crashed in the mountains near Barrancabermeja in Colombia, killing all but 2 of the 26 people on board.
- Bob Dylan recorded five tracks for his new album, The Freewheelin' Bob Dylan, at Columbia Records Studio A in New York City.
- Born: Claude Chirac, daughter, and later personal advisor, of French President Jacques Chirac; in Paris

== December 7, 1962 (Friday) ==
- The Atlas supercomputer, the most powerful in the world up to that time (with 576 KB storage), was dedicated at the University of Manchester. It was the first system ever designed for multiprogramming and would be used for the next decade.
- Rainier III, Prince of Monaco revised the principality's constitution, devolving some of his formerly autocratic power to several advisory and legislative councils.
- Bill Wyman was hired as bass player in The Rolling Stones.
- Born: Imad Mughniyah, Lebanese terrorist and the "security chief" of Hezbollah; in Tayr Dibba (killed by car bomb, 2008)
- Died:
  - Kirsten Flagstad, 67, Norwegian soprano; of bone marrow cancer
  - Bobo Newsom, 55, American baseball player

== December 8, 1962 (Saturday) ==
- The 1962–63 New York City newspaper strike began with the walkout of International Typographical Union members from their printing jobs, halting the production of all of the city's major newspapers. At the time, there were nine daily papers. The Times and the Daily News, as well as the now-defunct Journal-American and the World-Telegram & Sun were all directly affected. The Post and the now-extinct Herald Tribune, the Daily Mirror and the Long Island Star-Journal shut down their operations voluntarily. The strike would last for 114 days.
- The North Kalimantan National Army revolted in Brunei, in the first stirrings of the Indonesian Confrontation. The attempted coup, led by A. M. Azhari, was suppressed by British troops flown in from Singapore, but achieved its goal of preventing Brunei from joining the Malaysian Federation.
- The first period of the Second Vatican Council closed, with the next session to begin on September 8, 1963.
- The late Queen Wilhelmina of the Netherlands was buried at the New Church in Delft.
- Born: Marty Friedman, American guitarist, best known for his tenure as the lead guitarist of thrash metal band Megadeth from 1990 to 2000; in Washington, D.C.

== December 9, 1962 (Sunday) ==
- A year after it had become independent from the United Kingdom, Tanganyika (now Tanzania) became a republic within the Commonwealth, with Prime Minister Julius Nyerere becoming President, and Richard Gordon Turnbull ending his term as the only Governor-General of Tanganyika. Nyerere would continue as President after the nation's merger with Zanzibar, retiring on November 5, 1985.
- Peter Julian Eymard (1811–1868), the French priest who founded the Congregation of the Blessed Sacrament, was canonized as a saint in the Roman Catholic Church.

== December 10, 1962 (Monday) ==
- David Lean's epic film Lawrence of Arabia, featuring Peter O' Toole, Omar Sharif, Alec Guinness, Jack Hawkins, and Anthony Quinn, had its worldwide premiere as a special showing for Queen Elizabeth II and invited guests in London.
- North American Aviation began deployment flight testing of the half-scale test vehicle (HSTV) for Project Gemini. The HSTV was carried aloft slung beneath a helicopter. The purpose was to investigate problems in the transition from release of the rendezvous and recovery canister to gliding with the ejection, inflation, and deployment of the Rogallo wing. In the second test on January 8, the sail would disintegrate, and in the third on March 11, the recovery canister would fail to separate.
- Scottish boxer Jackie Brown defeated Nigeria's Orizu Obilaso to win the Commonwealth flyweight title.

== December 11, 1962 (Tuesday) ==
- The last execution in Canada took place at Don Jail, Toronto, when Ronald Turpin, 29, and Arthur Lucas, 54, convicted for separate murders, were hanged at the same time. Turpin had shot a constable in Toronto in February, while Lucas, an African-American from Detroit, had murdered two people in 1961. Years later, Chaplain Cyril Everitt would reveal in an interview that "The hanging was bungled. Turpin died clean, but Lucas' head was torn right off. It was hanging just by the sinews of the neck."; on July 14, 1976, Canada would abolish the death penalty by a vote of 131–124 in the House of Commons.
- In West Germany, a coalition government of Christian Democrats, Christian Socialists, and Free Democrats was formed. Hans Ehard stepped down as Minister-President of Bavaria, after a total of more than ten years in office, to be replaced by Alfons Goppel.

== December 12, 1962 (Wednesday) ==
- The first fully successful intercept of an intercontinental ballistic missile by an anti-missile missile was made. After an SM-65 Atlas ICBM was launched from Vandenberg Air Force Base in California, two Nike-Zeus missiles were fired from the Kwajalein Atoll, one of which passed close enough that, if it had been detonated, would have destroyed the incoming Atlas missile.
- Former Venezuelan President Marcos Pérez Jiménez was arrested at his luxury home in Miami Beach, Florida and taken to the Dade County jail, to face extradition back to Venezuela to face trial for embezzlement and for ordering the murder of political opponents. The arrest came minutes after a federal appellate court ruling denying his attempts to remain in the U.S.
- Owen E. Maynard, Head of MSC's Spacecraft Integration Branch, reported on the feasibility of modifying Apollo spacecraft systems to achieve a 100-day Earth-orbital capability.
- Born: Tracy Austin, American tennis player, Wimbledon women's singles champion 1979 and 1981; in Palos Verdes, California

== December 13, 1962 (Thursday) ==
- George Wright was indicted for murder. He would be found guilty and sentenced to 30 years in prison, but would escape in 1970, hijack a plane in 1972, and remain a fugitive until September 28, 2011.
- Siegfried Balke was dismissed from his cabinet post as West Germany's Minister for Nuclear Energy in a reshuffle resulting from the Spiegel affair.
- Died:
  - Rudolf Wissell, 93, German politician and former Minister for Economic Affairs in the Weimar Republic
  - Admiral of the Fleet John Cunningham, 77, British naval leader

== December 14, 1962 (Friday) ==
- The U.S. spacecraft Mariner 2 became the first Earth probe to successfully transmit data from another planet, as it flew by Venus. At 1:55 p.m. Florida time (1855 UTC), Mariner began transmitting data as it came within 21,641 miles (34,828 km) of Venus, and continued to transmit data until 2:37 p.m. (1937 UTC), then moved onward toward the Sun. The data showed for the first time the surface temperature of Venus, found to be 900 °F (482 °C), and revealed "a planet inhospitable to life", which "dashed hopes for a tropical, watery planet filled with aquatic and amphibious creatures", in the words of one observer.
- Hugh Gaitskell, the Leader of the Opposition in the United Kingdom as head of the Labour Party, first showed the symptoms of Lupus erythematosus, from which he would die 25 days later at the age of 56. Because the illness came the day after Gaitskell had visited the Soviet Embassy in London to have tea, and Soviet journals had described a drug that could cause systemic lupus, conspiracy theorists suggested a link between the two events. The Labour Party would win a majority two years later.
- Diplomatic clearance was obtained by the MSC from the NASA Office of International Programs for a survey trip to the Changi Air Field in Singapore, in conjunction with Project Mercury contingency recovery operations. The United Kingdom indicated that the Aden Protectorate could be used for contingency recovery aircraft for the Mercury 9 mission to be flown by Gordon Cooper in April 1963.
- The value of the Mona Lisa, by Leonardo da Vinci, was assessed for insurance purposes at US$100,000,000, before the painting was scheduled to begin its tour the United States for several months. At the time, it was the highest value ever set by an insurance company for a painting. The Louvre museum would eventually elect to spend the money on security instead.
- Five people were killed in a neighborhood in North Hollywood, California when a Lockheed L-1049H Super Constellation cargo plane, hauling freight for Flying Tigers, crashed and set six homes and two businesses on fire. All four of the crew on the plane died. The cause of the accident was later traced to the pilot suffering a heart attack as the plane was landing at the North Hollywood airport.
- All 50 people on a Panair do Brasil airplane were killed in the crash as the Lockheed L-049 Constellation that was approaching Manaus at the scheduled end of a 2,500-mile (4,000 km) flight from Belém. The airplane crashed in a jungle outside Manaus, and was not found until the next day.
- The United Nations General Assembly adopted Resolution 1803 about peoples' right to natural resources.

== December 15, 1962 (Saturday) ==
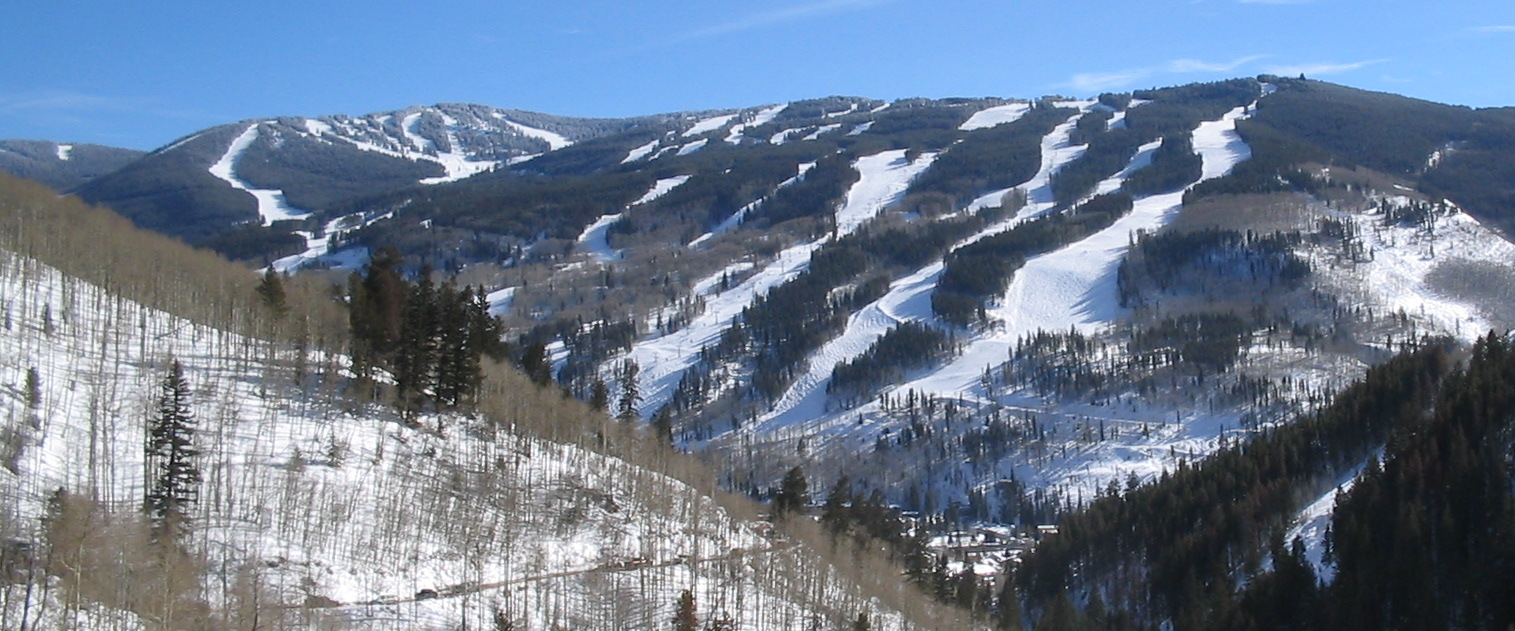
Vail Resort in 2005

- The Vail Ski Resort, largest in the United States, was opened in Eagle County, Colorado. On its first day, unseasonable weather left only ankle-deep snow at the top of the mountain, and none at the base, and three weeks after the novelty wore off, the resort that would become a favorite destination for celebrities (including U.S. President Gerald R. Ford) had only twelve customers.
- MSC researchers compiled the requirements for the study of a U.S. space station. Throughout the study, an overall objective would be simplicity, no artificial gravity, and maximum use of existing launch vehicles and spacecraft systems to achieve the earliest possible launch date.
- Ahmad Shukeiri, Saudi Arabia's permanent representative to the United Nations, was fired from his job by King Faisal, two weeks after openly offering a "salute" to the Tacuara Group, an anti-Semitic right wing organization in Argentina, in his speeches to the General Assembly.
- Facilities at Woomera, Australia, a segment of the Mercury global network for telemetry reception and air-to-ground voice communications, were declared no longer required for Mercury flights.
- A storm over the North Sea knocked the Belgian pirate radio station Radio Uylenspiegel off the airwaves, never to operate again.
- British driver Jim Clark won the 1962 Rand Grand Prix, held at Kyalami, South Africa.
- Died: Charles Laughton, 63, English film and stage actor, winner of the 1933 Academy Award for Best Actor for The Private Life of Henry VIII

== December 16, 1962 (Sunday) ==
- John Paul Scott became the first person confirmed to have escaped from the prison on Alcatraz Island and to have made it to the California mainland. Scott and Carl D. Parker had sawed through prison bars, and then plunged into the San Francisco Bay with homemade flotation devices, but both became victims of hypothermia in the chilly December waters. Parker gave up after swimming 100 yards (91 m) and came to shore at the western end of the island. Scott swam 3 miles (4.8 km) and was exhausted and freezing when he was found on the beach by two children.
- According to New Age "Messenger" Mark L. Prophet, he and other Messengers received the first dictation from one of the "Elohim of the First Ray" as "Amazonia" on raising mankind's spiritual consciousness.
- Đorđije Pajković became President of the Executive Council of the Socialist Republic of Montenegro, at the time a part of Yugoslavia.
- Died: Lew Landers (stage name for Louis Friedlander), 61, American film and TV director and actor

== December 17, 1962 (Monday) ==
- Mamadou Dia, the first Prime Minister of Senegal, was imprisoned along with Interior Minister Valdiodio N'diaye and Information Minister Ibrahima Sarr, on charges that the three plotted to overthrow President Léopold Sédar Senghor. The three men would spend more than 11 years in prison until being pardoned (along with 14 other political prisoners) by President Senghor on March 27, 1974.
- The MSC's newly formed Scientific Experiments Panel first met to solicit proposals for scientific experiments to be performed on Gemini and Apollo flights.
- Voters in South Korea approved the Constitution of the Third Republic in a nationwide referendum by a 78.8% yes vote.
- The new Constitution of Monaco was published.
- Died: Thomas Mitchell, 70, American actor who won an Academy Award for Best Supporting Actor (1939, Stagecoach), an Emmy Award for Best Dramatic Performance (1953, The Doctor), and a Tony Award (1953, Hazel Flagg)

== December 18, 1962 (Tuesday) ==
- Seventeen South Korean families, with 92 people total, set off from Pusan to resettle in Brazil, and would arrive in Santos on February 12. By the end of the century, there would be 50,000 Korean Brazilian residents, nearly all (92%) of whom would live in São Paulo.
- The animated musical holiday special Mister Magoo's Christmas Carol, debuted on NBC. It is the first animated Christmas special to be produced specifically for television.
- The Thirteenth Symphony of Dmitri Shostakovich was performed for the first time, but was "the object of petty censorship" by the Soviet Union's Communist Party.
- Died: Garrett Mattingly, 62, American historian and Pulitzer Prize winner, known for The Defeat of the Spanish Armada

== December 19, 1962 (Wednesday) ==
- The Soviet Union agreed, for the first time, to allow American inspections of its nuclear sites as part of a mutual bargain for each nation to verify the nuclear capability of the other, in a letter sent by Soviet Premier Khrushchev to U.S. President Kennedy. However, Khrushchev's offer of 2 or 3 annual on-site inspections was rejected by the U.S. on December 28 as not being enough.
- The Mona Lisa arrived in the United States for the first time, as cargo on board the S.S. France. After the Da Vinci masterpiece was unloaded at the French Line Pier in New York City, it was placed into a panel truck and driven to the National Gallery of Art in Washington, D.C. as part of a motorcade that included seven cars.
- All 33 people on a LOT Polish Airlines prop-jet were killed when the plane crashed while on its way from East Berlin to Warsaw, after starting in Brussels.
- Britain acknowledged the right of Nyasaland (now Malawi) to secede from the Central African Federation.
- The U.S. Air Force launched Titan II flight N-11 to develop the Titan II weapon system. It carried a design change intended to reduce the amplitude of longitudinal oscillations (POGO) observed on during first stage operation on all seven previous Titan II flights. POGO oscillations generated g-forces as high as 9g in the first stage and over 3g at the position on the missile corresponding to the location of the spacecraft on the Gemini launch vehicle. Fearing the potentially adverse effect on astronauts, NASA established 0.25g at 11 cycles per second as the maximum level tolerable for Gemini flights. Postflight analysis, however, revealed that the POGO fix was unsuccessful; longitudinal oscillation had actually been multiplied by a factor of two.

== December 20, 1962 (Thursday) ==
- The Osmonds, a musical group from Provo, Utah, made their national television debut on The Andy Williams Show, singing on Williams' Christmas special. The brothers ranging in age from 7 to 13, were Alan, Wayne, Merrill and Jay Osmond singing two songs. Their younger brother, Donny Osmond, would debut the following year.
- The Dominican Republic held its first free elections in more than 38 years, with voters making their choices for President, Congress and local offices. Juan Bosch of the Dominican Revolutionary Party defeated Viriato Fiallo of the National Civic Union, by a 2 to 1 margin, and would be sworn in as President on February 27.
- The first 116 National Treasures of Korea were designated, with the Namdaemun gate first on the list, followed by the Wongaksa Pagoda and the Bukhansan Monument.
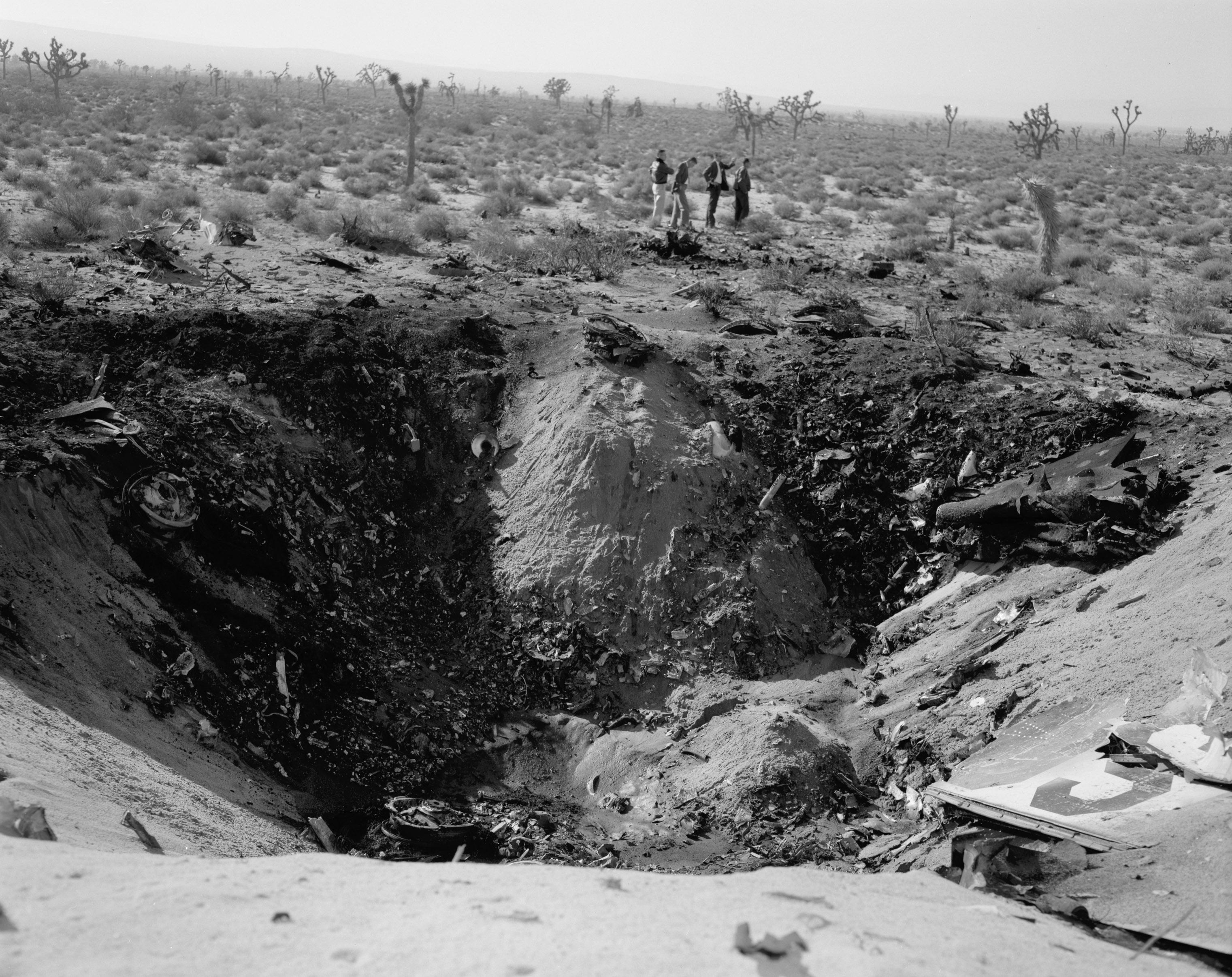
  Impact crater from Thompson's crashed Starfighter
- After making a weather evaluation flight for an impending X-15 flight in a NASA Lockheed JF-104A-10-LO Starfighter, NASA research pilot Milt Thompson made a simulated X-15 approach at Rogers Dry Lake, Edwards Air Force Base, California, but experienced major problems. Unable to resolve the situation, he ejected while inverted at 18,000 feet (5,500 m) after the airframe had made four complete rolls. The fighter impacted nose first on the Edwards AFB bombing range, while Thompson descended safely by parachute without injury.
- Died: Emil Artin, 64, Austrian mathematician known as the co-founder of abstract algebra

== December 21, 1962 (Friday) ==
- At a meeting between British Prime Minister Harold Macmillan and U.S. President John F. Kennedy in the Bahamas at Nassau, the United Kingdom agreed to purchase Polaris missiles from the United States, to replace the British-made Skybolt missiles. The Macmillan government was heavily criticized by the opposition, with accusations that he had sacrificed Britain's "nuclear independence" with no apparent gain.
- Rondane National Park was established as Norway's first national park.

== December 22, 1962 (Saturday) ==
- For the first time, a song by a British band reached #1 on the American singles chart. More than a year before The Beatles began music's "British Invasion", the instrumental song "Telstar" became a hit for The Tornados.
- The "Big Freeze" began in Britain. There would be no frost-free nights until March 5, 1963.
- Born: Ralph Fiennes, English stage and film actor, film producer and director, winner of the 1993 BAFTA Award for Best Actor in Schindler's List, and the 1995 Tony Award for Best Actor for the 1995 Broadway production of Hamlet; in Ipswich, Suffolk

== December 23, 1962 (Sunday) ==
- The first 107 members of Brigade 2506, participants in the Bay of Pigs Invasion, were returned to the United States from Cuba, when a chartered Pan American DC-6B arrived at Florida's Homestead Air Force Base at 6:06 p.m. The repatriation would continue for two days.
- A South Korean patrol boat fought a gunbattle with a North Korean naval vessel near Yunpyung Island in the Yellow Sea, south of the line between the two nations' waters. Two South Korean sailors were killed and four injured.
- The Dallas Texans defeated the Houston Oilers in the 1962 American Football League Championship Game, winning 20–17 in overtime, before 37,981 in Houston.
- Died:
  - José Giral, 83, 75th Prime Minister of Spain from July 19 to September 4, 1936
  - Harmodio Arias, 77, President of Panama in 1931 and again from 1932 to 1936

== December 24, 1962 (Monday) ==
- Cuba released the other 1,113 participants from Brigade 2506, who had participated in the Bay of Pigs Invasion to the U.S., in exchange for food worth $53 million. The final flight for Operation Ransom arrived at the Homestead AFB at 9:00 p.m.
- Born: Hezekiah Walker, American gospel musician and two-time Grammy Award winner; in Brooklyn
- Died: Wilhelm Ackermann, 66, German mathematician known for the Ackermann function in the theory of computation

== December 25, 1962 (Tuesday) ==
- The Niña II, a replica of the smallest of the three ships that Christopher Columbus had brought to the New World in 1492, arrived at the Bahamas' San Salvador Island after a voyage that took 47 days longer than the original trip. Captain Carlos Etayo and a crew of 8 had set off from the Spanish port at Palos de la Frontera on September 19 with the goal of retracing Columbus's route with hopes of finishing on October 12, but had not left the Canary Islands until October 10, then was not heard from for fifty days. Columbus had sailed from Spain to the Bahamas in 70 days, between August 3 and October 12, 1492.
- The Thai-language daily newspaper Thai Rath was founded by Kampol Vacharaphol.
- Died: Warren Austin, 85, the first U.S. Ambassador to the United Nations (1946–1953), previously U.S. Senator for Vermont (1931–1946)

== December 26, 1962 (Wednesday) ==
- Dinmukhamed Konayev became the Premier head of government of the Kazakh SSR (Chairman of the Council of Ministers) for the second time, after being removed from the more powerful job as First Secretary of the Communist Party's Kazakh section.
- Y. A. Tittle of the New York Giants, who two years earlier was let go by the San Francisco 49ers, was named the United Press International player of the year for the 1962 NFL season.
- A boundary treaty was signed by the Mongolian People's Republic and China, setting out the border along 26 disputed sections.
- Jamaica signed up to the ILO's Right to Organise and Collective Bargaining Convention.
- Died: Calcedonio Di Pisa, 31, Sicilian mafioso, was murdered on the Piazza Principe di Camporeale in Palermo while walking to a tobacco kiosk.

== December 27, 1962 (Thursday) ==
- Astronomer Maarten Schmidt made the first visual identification of a quasar, aiming the telescope of the Palomar Observatory in California at 3C 273, visible from Earth within the constellation Virgo.
- Born:
  - Pierlucio Tinazzi, Italian security officer who died while rescuing people in the 1999 Mont Blanc tunnel fire; in Morgex, Aosta Valley
  - Simon King, British wildlife photographer and broadcaster; in Nairobi, Kenya
- Died: Serge Raynaud de la Ferriere, 46, French religious philosopher

== December 28, 1962 (Friday) ==
- U.S. President Kennedy replied to Soviet Premier Khrushchev's December 19 letter, rejecting the idea of no more than three on-site inspections of nuclear facilities each year. Khrushchev would say later that "he had been led to believe", by negotiator Arthur Dean, that the U.S. would settle for three or four visits per year, while Kennedy said that Dean had mentioned between 8 and 10 inspections. No inspections would take place at all until 1988.
- Died: Kathleen Clifford, 75, American stage and screen actress

== December 29, 1962 (Saturday) ==
- An Airnautic airliner from France crashed into Monte Renoso on the island of Corsica as it was approaching the airport at Ajaccio, killing all 25 people on board. The French investigation determined that the errors by the crew had caused the accident.
- The Ralph Waldo Emerson House in Concord and the John Greenleaf Whittier House in Amesbury were designated National Historic Landmarks, along with several other historic houses in the U.S. state of Massachusetts.
- Great Britain's longest, coldest winter in the 20th century began with a blizzard. Freezing temperatures would continue for more than two months, cancelling regularly scheduled events, and would not abate until March 6.
- The 1962 South African Grand Prix was held in East London and won by Graham Hill. The victory also clinched the 1962 World Drivers Championship for Hill.

== December 30, 1962 (Sunday) ==
- The American Basketball League, the attempt by Abe Saperstein to compete against the NBA, played its last games. The Pittsburgh Rens beat the Kansas City Steers in overtime, 119–116, before a crowd of only 1,858 at home. In the other two games, the Philadelphia Tapers beat the Chicago Majors, 95–86, in a game at Cleveland before 7,000, and the Long Beach Chiefs defeated the visiting Oakland Oaks, 104–100, before a crowd of only 1,002. Saperstein folded the league the next day, with Kansas City's 22–9 record being best in the six-team league.
- American oceanographer Albert Oshiver became the first person to ever swim from one end of the Panama Canal to the other, swimming non-stop from Gatun to Gamboa in 29 hours. Oshiver was charged a 4-cent toll for the privilege of using the shortcut between the Atlantic and Pacific Oceans, "the smallest toll ever collected at the Panama Canal".
- An unexpected storm buried the U.S. state of Maine under 5 feet (1.5 m) of snow, forcing the Bangor Daily News to miss a publication date for the first and only time in history. The same day, the Netherlands was also covered with several feet of snow.
- United Nations troops occupied the last rebel positions in Katanga, and former President Moïse Tshombe moved to Southern Rhodesia (now Zimbabwe).
- "Blowin' in the Wind", the famous folk song by Bob Dylan, was performed for the first time, as part of a BBC television play called Madhouse On Castle Street.
- The Green Bay Packers defeated the New York Giants, 16–7, to win the 1962 NFL Championship Game, before 64,892 at the Polo Grounds in New York City.
- Died: Arthur Oncken Lovejoy, 89, American philosopher who founded the "history of ideas"

== December 31, 1962 (Monday) ==
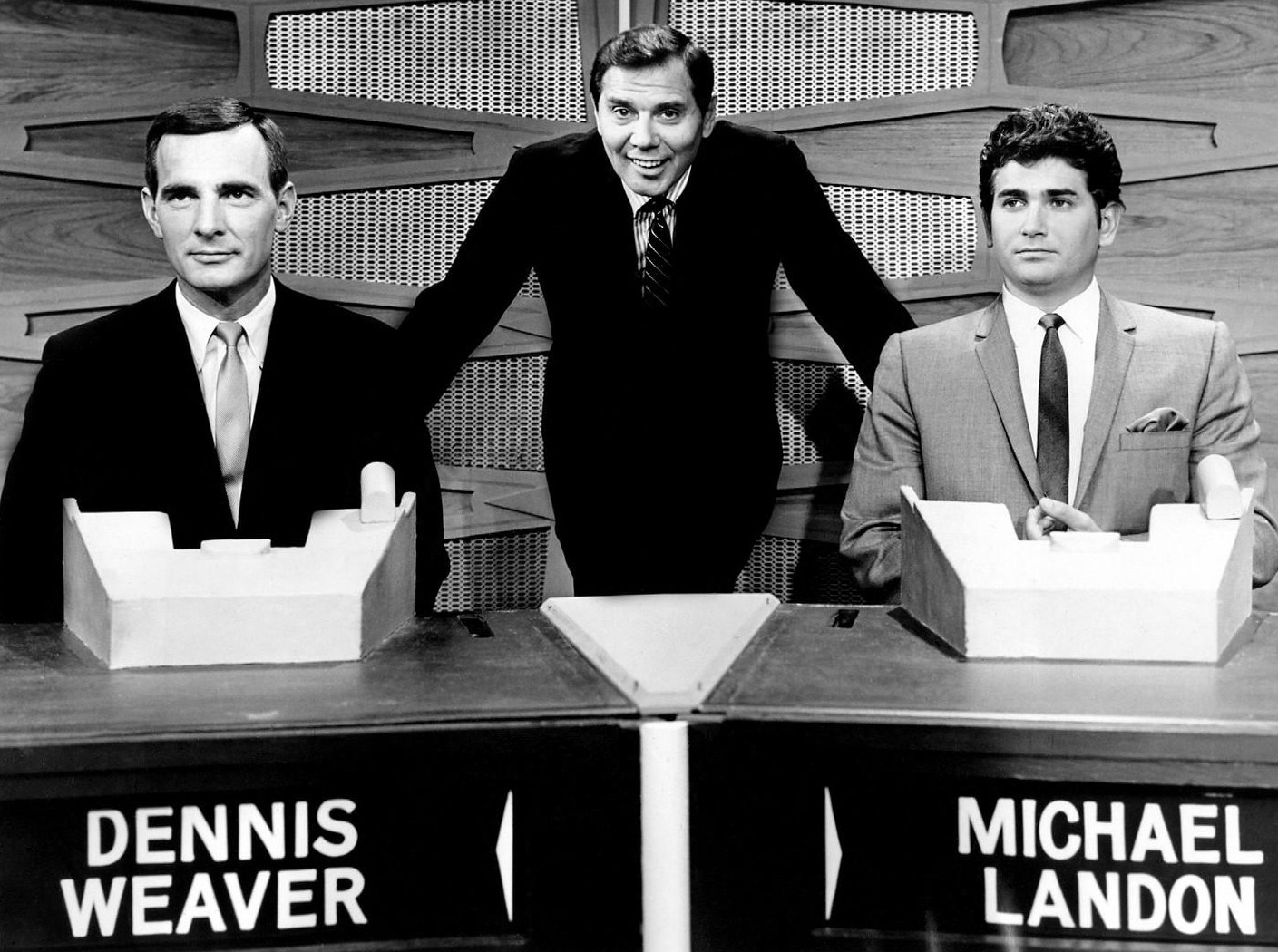
Rayburn (center) on The Match Game

- The long-running U.S. TV game show The Match Game premiered on the NBC television network, with host Gene Rayburn, as a show in which guest celebrities were paired with four members of the audience to match the most popular answer to a fill-in-the-blank question. The original celebrity guests were Arlene Francis and Skitch Henderson. After going off the air in 1969, the show would return as "Match Game '73" in a new format with Rayburn on July 2, 1973, featuring six celebrity panelists and many risqué questions.
- The body of 23-year-old Patricia Bissette was found in her apartment. She was the eighth victim of Albert DeSalvo, the "Boston Strangler". DeSalvo would later confess that he had gotten the name of Bissette's roommate from the mailbox and had posed as the roommate's friend to gain entry.
- By the end of 1962, the cumulative cost of the 1959 NASA contract with the McDonnell Aircraft Corporation for the Mercury program had reached $135,764,042.
- Tradair, a failing British airline with nine airplanes, was acquired by East Anglian Flying Services, which renamed itself Channel Airways.
