= Amina N'Diaye-Leclerc =

- Born: 1952 (age 73–74); Kaolack
- Occupations: filmmaker and artist

Amina N'Diaye-Leclerc (born 1952) is a Senegalese filmmaker and artist living in France.

== Life ==
Amina N'Diaye-Leclerc is of French-Senegalese origin, the daughter of Senegalese lawyer and politician Valdiodio N'diaye. Born in Kaolack in 1952, she studied Spanish language and literature in Toulouse. After a while working as a commercial agent for Air Africa, she started working in filmmaking in 1991. She also took up painting in 2000.

== Works ==
- (co-directed with Éric Cloué) Valdiodio N'Diaye, l'indépendance du Sénégal, 2000.
