= January 1963 =

Month of 1963

<<	January 1963					>>
Su	Mo	Tu	We	Th	Fr	Sa
		1	2	3	4	5
6	7	8	9	10	11	12
13	14	15	16	17	18	19
20	21	22	23	24	25	26
27	28	29	30	31

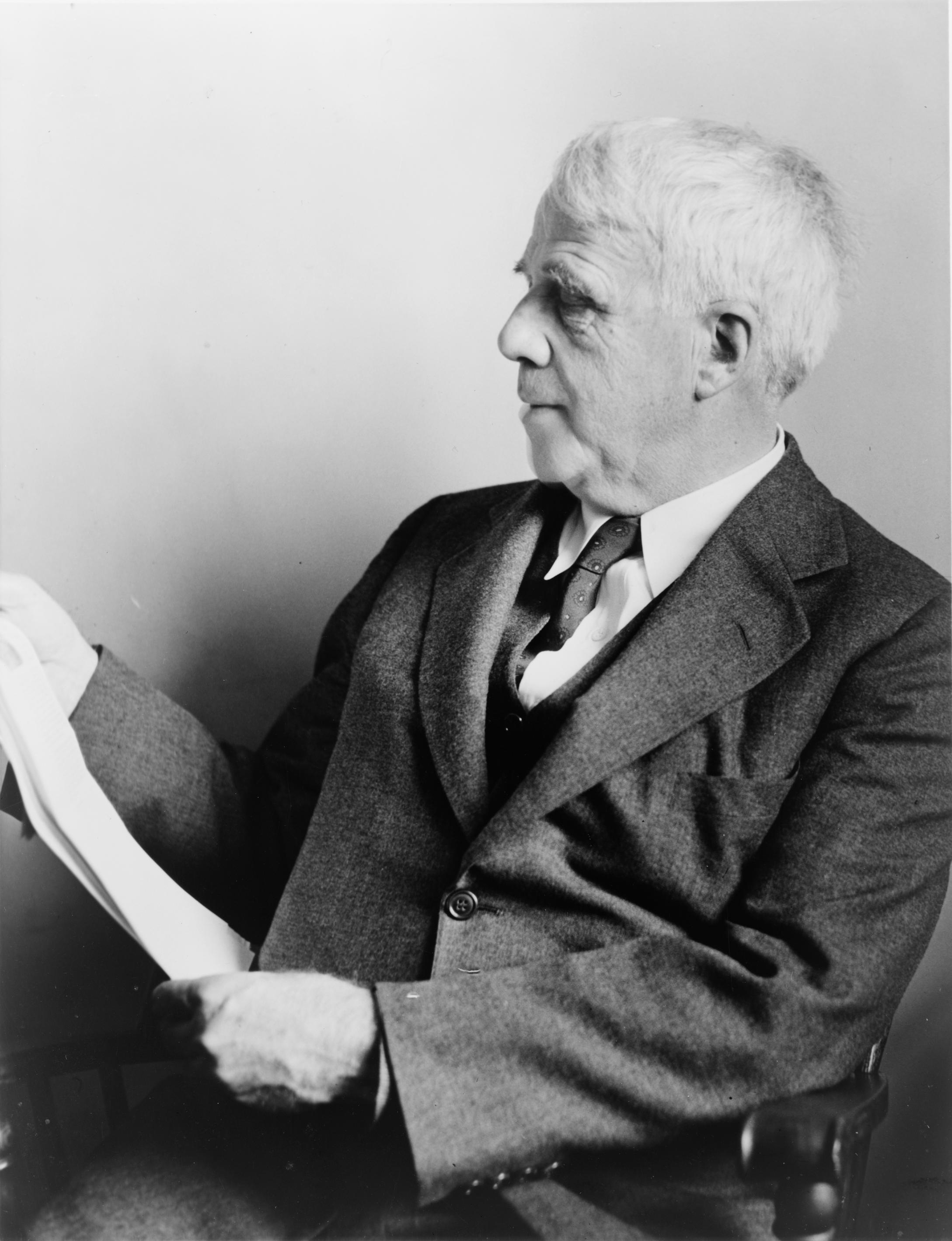
January 29, 1963: American poet Robert Frost dies at 88

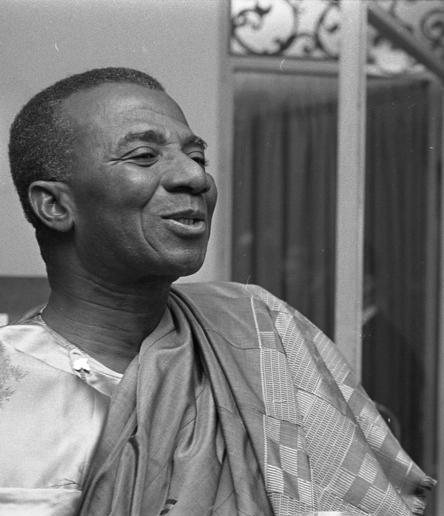
January 13, 1963: Togo's President Sylvanus Olympio killed while trying to flee to U.S. Embassy

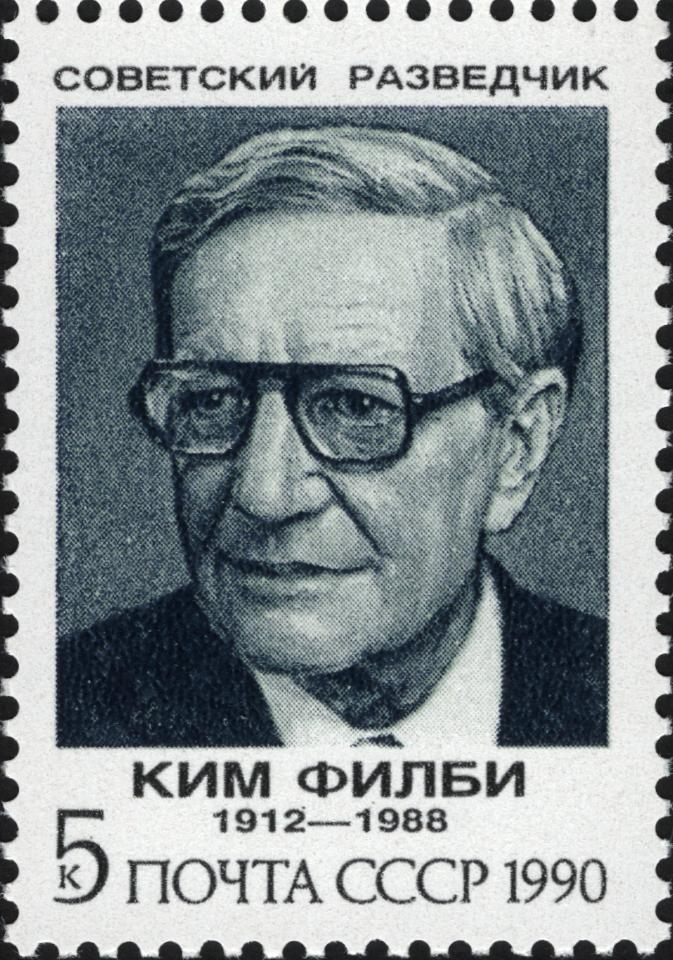
January 23, 1963: British MI5 agent Kim Philby flees to USSR

The following events occurred in January 1963:

== January 1, 1963 (Tuesday) ==
- In the United States, the #1 ranked (and unofficial college football champion) USC Trojans and the #2 Wisconsin Badgers met in the 1963 Rose Bowl before a crowd of 98,696 people. At the time, American college football's national championship was determined by the Associated Press and UPI polls taken at the end of the regular season. The first and second ranked teams happened to be the respective champions of the Big Six Conference (now the Pac-12 Conference) and the Big Ten Conference. USC won 42–37, holding off a fourth quarter, 23-point rally by Wisconsin.
- Osamu Tezuka's Tetsuwan Atomu (Astro Boy), Japan's first serialized animated series based on the popular manga, was broadcast for the first time. It premiered on Japanese television station Fuji TV.
- The U.S. city of Chesapeake, Virginia, was created from a merger of the city of South Norfolk and the remainder of surrounding Norfolk County, Virginia.
- Died:
  - Robert S. Kerr, 66, U.S. Senator for Oklahoma since 1948 and oil multi-millionaire, nicknamed "the uncrowned King of the Senate". Kerr, who had been in Doctors Hospital in Washington, D.C., for three weeks from a "virus ailment", suffered a fatal heart attack "while sitting on a bed talking to his physician."
  - Dr. Gilbert Bogle, 38, research scientist with Australia's governmental scientific agency, CSIRO, was found dead along with Margaret Chandler, the wife of a colleague. Both were apparently overcome by poisonous fumes in bushland near the Lane Cove River, Sydney.

== January 2, 1963 (Wednesday) ==
- The Battle of Ap Bac in South Vietnam began, and was the first time that Viet Cong forces stood and fought against a major South Vietnamese attack. At the outset, Viet Cong ground fire shot down a United States Army UH-1 attack helicopter and four U.S. Army CH-21 transport helicopters as they arrived at their landing zone. Republic of Vietnam Air Force C-123 Provider transport planes dropped about 300 South Vietnamese paratroopers later in the day. Despite outnumbering the Viet Cong 4 to 1, and having American armor, artillery and helicopters, "what should have been an ARVN victory turned into an exercise of everything that was wrong with the South Vietnamese army".
- Seventeen people were killed in an explosion at the Home Packing Company in Terre Haute, Indiana.
- Born:
  - Edgar Martínez, Puerto Rican American baseball player, five-time Silver Slugger Award (between 1992 and 2003) for best performance as third baseman and designated hitter, 2019 enshrinee in the National Baseball Hall of Fame; in New York City
  - David Cone, American baseball pitcher, 1994 AL Cy Young Award winner, three-time MLB strikeout leader who pitched a perfect game in 1999; in Kansas City, Missouri

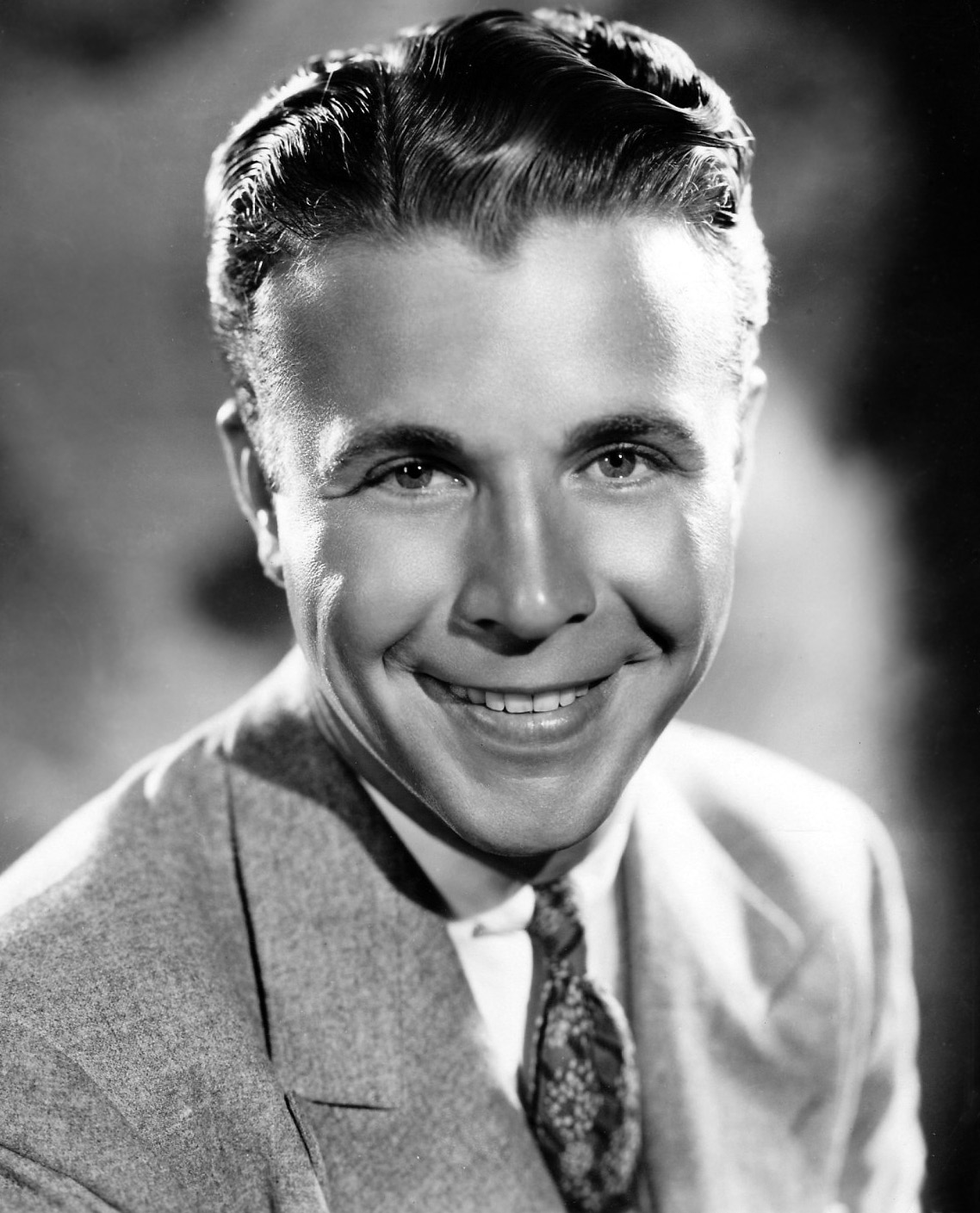
Powell

- Died:
  - Dick Powell, 58, American actor and singer, died from lymphatic cancer one day after his pre-recorded introduction to the stories of his anthology series, The Dick Powell Show, had been telecast. The show would continue for the rest of the season under the same name with various celebrities hosting, but without Powell's introductions.
  - Jack Carson, 52, Canadian-American comedian and character actor, died from stomach cancer.

== January 3, 1963 (Thursday) ==
- At a press conference in Ottawa, U.S. Army General Lauris Norstad's answer to a reporter's question set in motion a series of events that would bring the downfall of Canadian Prime Minister John Diefenbaker. General Norstad had recently retired as NATO's Supreme Allied Commander in Europe. Asked by Charles Lynch of the Ottawa Citizen whether he was saying that Canada's refusal to accept nuclear weapons for its airplanes meant "that she is not actually fulfilling her NATO commitments", General Norstad said, "I believe that is right."
- Thirty-two Soviet civilians from Siberia forced their way into the United States Embassy in Moscow, describing themselves as "persecuted Christians" and seeking political asylum. After embassy officials told the group that they could not stay, the people were placed on a bus and taken away by Moscow police. The 6 men, 12 women and 14 children were sent back to Chernogorsk that evening, after the U.S. Embassy received assurances that the group would get "good treatment".
- Contact with the American Mariner 2 space probe was lost after 128 days of data transmitted from the planet Venus and from the Sun. Attempts from Earth on January 8 to restart transmission, failed, and the craft was not found during searches made on May 28 and August 16.
- The "Big Freeze of 1963" in the United Kingdom caused the cancellation of all but three of the scheduled third round matches of the 1962–63 FA Cup. The blizzard was "the worst snow in Britain's 100 years of recorded weather history".
- NASA made tentative plans to extend the Mercury 9 flight from 18 to 22 orbits.

== January 4, 1963 (Friday) ==
- An express train crashed into the rear of a standing passenger train at Meghnagar, Madhya Pradesh, India. Eight passenger cars were crushed or caught fire after an explosion. At least 38 people were confirmed dead and 90 injured.
- The Soviet Union successfully launched Luna E-6 No.2, but a malfunction kept the craft from going beyond low Earth orbit. Seven days later, the decay of the orbit would cause the satellite to re-enter and burn in the atmosphere.
- The Manned Spacecraft Center (MSC) directed McDonnell Aircraft Corporation to study requirements for space rendezvous experiments on the second and third Project Gemini flights.
- Born:
  - Till Lindemann, German singer, songwriter and poet (Rammstein); in Leipzig, East Germany
  - Dave Foley, Canadian-American actor; in Etobicoke, Ontario
- Died: Yusuf Izzuddin Shah, 72, Sultan of Perak since 1948. He received the posthumous title of "Marhum Ghafarullah".

== January 5, 1963 (Saturday) ==
- The military government of Peru began a nationwide roundup of suspected Communists, arresting more than 300 people accused of plotting subversion.
- In New York City, the musical Camelot closed after 873 performances and a Broadway run of more than two years.
- Died:
  - Stanisław Jaros, 30, Polish electrician and would-be political assassin, convicted of attempting to kill Polish leader Wladyslaw Gomulka and Soviet leader Nikita Khrushchev, was executed by hanging.
  - Rogers Hornsby, 66, American baseball player and manager, inductee to the Baseball Hall of Fame
  - Erik Strandmark, 43, Swedish film actor, was killed in a plane crash.

== January 6, 1963 (Sunday) ==
- Voters in Brazil overwhelmingly rejected a parliamentary form of government in a plebiscite, and approved a strong executive system under President João Goulart. Only 2,073,582 were in favor of retaining the ministerial system, while 9,457,448 voted against it.
- The Shah of Iran launched his six-point White Revolution for ending illiteracy, reforming agriculture and industry, advancing women's suffrage, and nationalization of forests.
- The British musical Oliver!, based on the Charles Dickens novel Oliver Twist, made its debut on Broadway, at the Imperial Theatre, and ran for 774 performances.
- Born:
  - Tony Halme, Finnish professional wrestler who worked for WWF (now WWE) and MMA (d. 2010); in Helsinki
  - Paul Kipkoech, Kenyan long-distance runner (d. 1995); in Kapsabet

== January 7, 1963 (Monday) ==
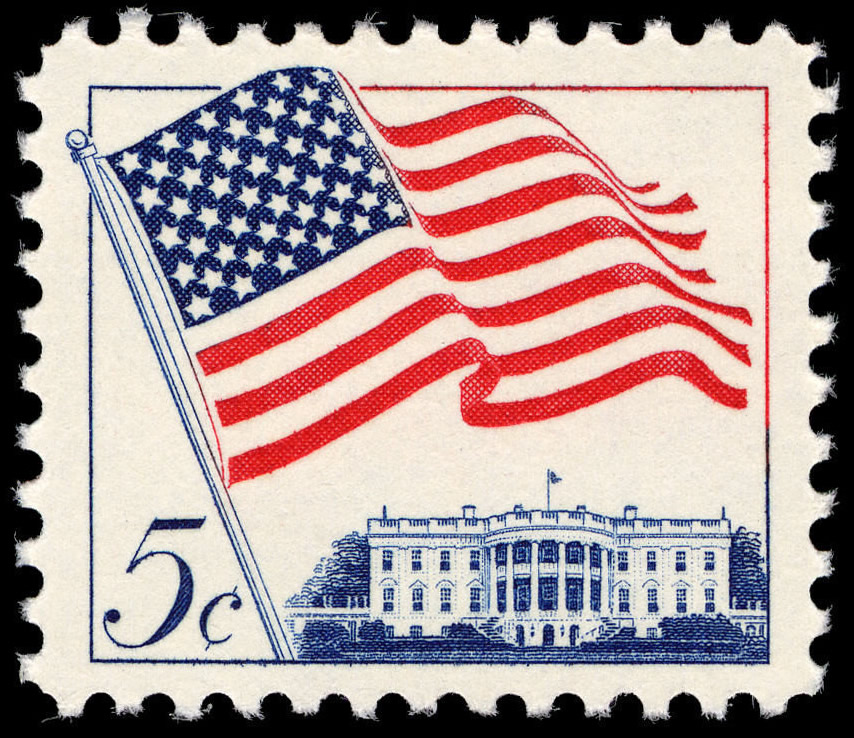
A 5¢ stamp

- The price of mailing a letter in the United States rose from four cents to five cents, with a 25% increase in the price of a first class stamp. The increase was the first since August 1, 1958, when the price had changed from three cents to four.
- Final acceptance tests were conducted on the U.S. Project Mercury space flight simulator at Ellington Field in Texas. The equipment had been moved from Virginia's Langley Field to Houston. The MSC and the Farrand Optical Company conducted the acceptance tests.
- The Soviet national airline Aeroflot launched its service to Cuba from Moscow to Havana, using Tu-114 turboprop airplanes.
- Died: Arthur Edward Moore, 86, Australian politician, Premier of Queensland from 1929 to 1932

== January 8, 1963 (Tuesday) ==
- Leonardo da Vinci's Mona Lisa was exhibited in the United States for the first time, at the National Gallery of Art in Washington, D.C., in an event attended by President Kennedy and 2,000 other guests of honor. The masterpiece was on view for 27 days in Washington, during which 674,000 visitors came to see it, then moved on to the Metropolitan Museum of Art in New York from February 6 to March 4.
- MSC outlined requirements for McDonnell to use for Gemini aborts in orbit. These included onboard controlled reentry for all aborts, except for guidance and control system failure; onboard selection emergency abort target areas; navigational accuracy to a 2-mile (3.2 km) radius error at the point of impact; and crew capability to eject from the spacecraft with the paraglider deployed.

== January 9, 1963 (Wednesday) ==
- A relatively rare total penumbral lunar eclipse took place, with the Moon passing entirely within the penumbral shadow without entering the darker umbral shadow.
- Flight Operations Division set requirements for the remote stations of the Gemini worldwide tracking network.
- Born:
  - Monika Bittl, German writer, journalist and screenwriter; in Beilngries, Bavaria
  - Michael Everson, American-Irish linguist, script encoder, typesetter, type designer and publisher; in Norristown, Pennsylvania

== January 10, 1963 (Thursday) ==
- The Soviet Air Forces space program of selected its second cosmonaut group of 15 men to train for future Soyuz missions. The group included Vladimir Shatalov (Soyuz 4, 8, and 10), Anatoly Filipchenko (Soyuz 7 and 16), Georgy Dobrovolsky (Soyuz 11), Yury Artyukhin (Soyuz 14), Lev Dyomin (Soyuz 15), Aleksei Gubarev (Soyuz 17 and 28) and Vitaly Zholobov (Soyuz 21).
- The American film Cape Fear, directed by J. Lee Thompson, was finally released in the United Kingdom, but only after Thompson agreed to 161 cuts of dialogue ordered by the censors of the British Board of Film Classification in order to avoid an "X" rating.
- Representatives of MSC, McDonnell, and the Eagle-Picher Company reviewed plans for developing the silver-zinc batteries for the Gemini spacecraft. McDonnell concluded that a four-battery installation, if closely monitored, would be adequate.
- Titan II flight N-15 was launched from Cape Canaveral. It was the second to achieve significantly reduced levels of longitudinal oscillations by means of propellant tank pressurization.
- Duma Nokwe, the Secretary-General of the African National Congress, fled from South Africa before he could be arrested under the nation's Sabotage Act.
- Emmett Hall, the Chief Justice of the Saskatchewan Supreme Court, was sworn in as a justice of the Supreme Court of Canada.
- Died: Tadeusz Szeligowski, 66, Polish composer, educator, lawyer and music organizer

== January 11, 1963 (Friday) ==
- Two people in China, an 18-year-old fisherman and his seven-year-old younger brother, were fatally injured after the man took home a piece of radioactive cobalt-60 that had been dropped on farmland owned by the Anhui Agricultural University in Hefei. The cobalt-60 radiation level was measured at 43 petabecquerel. Over a period of almost nine days before the sample was recovered, the man was exposed to 806 grays of radiation and died on January 23. His brother died two days later from exposure to 40 grays.
- The Beatles released "Please Please Me" in the United Kingdom, with "Ask Me Why" as the B-side. The group would perform the song on TV two days later on the ITV program Thank Your Lucky Stars. "Please Please Me" would become the first Beatles' single to reach #1 in the UK.
- The Project Engineering Field Office (located at Cape Canaveral) of the Mercury Project Office outlined 17 specific changes to Mercury spacecraft 20 (MA-9) after its receipt at Cape Canaveral from McDonnell Aircraft.
- Born: Gloria Ramirez, American woman (d. 1994).
  - Rita Blanco, Portuguese actress.
  - Dean Reynolds, British professional snooker player.
  - Sam Kieth, American comics artist and writer (d. 2026).
- Died: Arthur Nock, English classicist and theologian (b. 1902).

== January 12, 1963 (Saturday) ==
- At the Australian National Athletics Championships in her home town of Perth, Western Australia, Margaret Burvill set a new world record of 23.2 seconds in the women's 220 yard dash.
- Born: Nando Reis, Brazilian musician and producer; in São Paulo

== January 13, 1963 (Sunday) ==
- Sylvanus Olympio, the 60-year-old President of Togo, was assassinated. Olympio apparently was seeking refuge at the United States Embassy in Lomé, next to the presidential palace. U.S. Ambassador Leon B. Poullada said that "the body, riddled by several bullets, was found crumpled only three feet from the embassy's gate". The President's killer, Colonel Étienne Eyadéma, would assume the presidency in 1967 and hold the office until his death in 2005.
- Born: Peter Scully, Australian convicted murderer and pedophile; in Melbourne

== January 14, 1963 (Monday) ==
- The Manned Spacecraft Center presented the proposal to NASA Headquarters that the ground light visibility experiment of Wally Schirra's Mercury 8 mission be repeated for Mercury 9, with the short-range objective of determining the capability of an astronaut to visually evaluate a ground light of known intensity while in orbit, as seen from the spacecraft at varying distances from the light source. A long-range goal was for lights from Earth to be used as a signal to provide advanced spacecraft with an Earth reference point.
- George C. Wallace was sworn in as Governor of Alabama. In his inaugural speech, he defiantly proclaimed "In the name of the greatest people that have ever trod this earth, I draw the line in the dust and toss the gauntlet before the feet of tyranny, and I say 'segregation now, segregation tomorrow, and segregation forever.' Let us send this message back to Washington, that from this day we are standing up, and the heel of tyranny does not fit the neck of an upright man."
- MSC assumed complete responsibility for the Gemini target vehicle program from Marshall Space Flight Center (MSFC). All other NASA Atlas-Agena programs were transferred to Lewis Research Center in order to allow MSFC to concentrate on developing the Saturn rocket to consolidate Atlas rocket technology at Lewis.
- A fire killed 105 of the 250 people on the Indonesian tourist ferryboat Djandji Raja as it was traversing the Toba Lake in North Sumatra. The broke out in the engine room of the ferryboat, then caused a fuel tank to explode. Word of the accident did not reach Jakarta until five days later.
- The Rolling Stones, with Mick Jagger, guitarists Keith Richards and Brian Jones, pianist Ian Stewart, bass guitarist Bill Wyman and drummer Charlie Watts first played together as a group, with a performance at The Flamingo Club in the West End of London.
- A month before she would commit suicide, Sylvia Plath was able to realize the publication of her first and only novel, The Bell Jar, by the Heinemann company.
- France's President Charles de Gaulle indicated in a press conference that he would veto the application of the United Kingdom to join the Common Market.
- The locomotive Flying Scotsman (British Railways No. 60103) made its last scheduled run, before going into the hands of Alan Pegler for preservation.

== January 15, 1963 (Tuesday) ==
- In his State of the Union address at a joint session of the U.S. Congress, President Kennedy called on Congress to pass legislation to lower income taxes as a means of stimulating the economy. Kennedy called for individual tax rates, ranging from 20% to as much as 91% for the highest brackets, to be cut to a range of 14% to 65%, and for the corporate rate to be cut from 52% to 47%. The bill would not become law until after Kennedy's death, signed by his successor, President Lyndon B. Johnson on February 26, 1964.
- The Katanga Crisis came to an end as Moise Tshombe declared the end of his attempt to secede from the Congo, and ordered a surrender to the United Nations forces.
- An accident killed 47 workers in India, and injured 62 others who had been working underground at Naraj, in the Orissa state.
- Died:
  - Cesare Fantoni, 58, Italian film actor
  - Jean-Baptiste Ntidendereza, 36, Interior Minister of Burundi, was publicly executed for attempting to murder a political opponent.

== January 16, 1963 (Wednesday) ==
- Soviet Premier Nikita Khrushchev visited the Berlin Wall from the East Berlin side, then delivered an address to the Communist leadership of East Germany at the SED Party Congress. Khrushchev stated bluntly that the Wall had accomplished its purpose of stemming the exodus of citizens from the nation and stabilized the East German economy, and added that further Soviet economic assistance would not be forthcoming. "Neither God nor the devil will give you bread or butter if you do not manage it with your own hands," Khrushchev said, adding that East Germany "must not expect alms from some rich uncle".
- Saudi Arabia and the United Kingdom resumed diplomatic relations, more than six years after the two nations had closed their embassies during the 1956 Suez Crisis.
- The 1963 NBA All-Star Game was played at Los Angeles Memorial Sports Arena. The Eastern Conference team beat the Western Conference, 115–108.
- Born: James May, British television presenter; in Bristol
- Died:
  - Gilardo Gilardi, 73, Argentine composer, pianist and conductor
  - Ike Quebec, 44, American jazz saxophonist, died from lung cancer.

== January 17, 1963 (Thursday) ==
- NASA Administrator James E. Webb and United States Secretary of Defense Robert S. McNamara signed a new agreement on the division of Department of Defense (DOD) and NASA management responsibilities in Cape Canaveral area. The U.S. Air Force would continue as single manager of the Atlantic Missile Range and NASA's Launch Operations Center would manage the Merritt Island Launch Area, north and west of existing DOD installations.
- U.S. Attorney General Robert F. Kennedy made "his first, and last, appearance as a lawyer in a courtroom", participating in the oral argument before the United States Supreme Court in Gray v. Sanders, regarding whether the county-unit system of voting that had been used in the U.S. State of Georgia was unconstitutional.
- The Skyvan passenger and cargo carrying aircraft, designed in Northern Ireland by the Short Brothers aerospace company, made its first flight, taking off from its Sydenham, Belfast airfield.
- Died: Johannes Sejersted Bødtker, 83, Norwegian banker and patron of the arts

== January 18, 1963 (Friday) ==
- Severe winter conditions in the Netherlands eliminated 9,225 of the 9,294 ice skating participants in the nation's annual "eleven city tour", the elfstedentocht. Only 69 people finished the 200 kilometres (120 mi) round trip that starts and ends at Leeuwarden by way of Sneek, IJlst, Sloten, Stavoren, Hindeloopen, Workum, Bolsward, Harlingen, Franeker, and Dokkum.
- The French automobile manufacturer Simca was taken over by the American automaker Chrysler, which purchased a controlling interest of the 18,000 employee company in order to increase its presence in Europe.
- Died:
  - Edward Titchmarsh, 63, British mathematician who contributed the Titchmarsh convolution theorem, the Titchmarsh theorem on Hilbert transform, the Titchmarsh–Kodaira formula on differential equations, and the Brun–Titchmarsh theorem.
  - Hugh Gaitskell, 56, the leader of Britain's Labour Party, died of kidney failure caused by lupus erythematosus
  - Johnny Moyes, 70, Australian cricketer and radio commentator

== January 19, 1963 (Saturday) ==
- Hermine Braunsteiner, formerly a supervising warden at the Ravensbrück concentration camp, and known as "The Stomping Mare" because of her use of steel-studded jackboots to kick inmates, became a naturalized citizen of the United States. Acting on a tip from Nazi hunter Simon Wiesenthal, The New York Times would expose her past in 1964. Her citizenship would be revoked in 1971, and in 1973 she would be extradited to West Germany for trial as a war criminal. In 1981, she would be sentenced to life imprisonment. Released after 15 years for health reasons (including, ironically, the amputation of her leg), she would die in 1999.
- Born: Caron Wheeler, British soul singer; in Acton, London
- Died: Thomas Kennedy, 75, American labor leader who succeeded John L. Lewis as President of the United Mine Workers of America in 1960, died at his home in Hazleton, Pennsylvania. His deputy, Tony Boyle became the new UMWA President until an election could be held.

== January 20, 1963 (Sunday) ==
- The "Konfrontasi", literally a confrontation between Indonesia and the proposed union of the former British colonies of Malaya, Sarawak, Sabah and Singapore as the Federation of Malaysia, was declared in a speech by the Indonesian Foreign Minister, Subandrio. Indonesia shared a border with Sarawak and Sabah on the island of Borneo, and opposed their incorporation into a larger nation. Although avoiding a direct war with the United Kingdom, which maintained bases on Borneo, Indonesia engaged in skirmishes along the Sarawak border, and 37 bombings at various locations in Singapore. The war would come to an end with the signing of a treaty on August 11, 1966, after the overthrow of Indonesia's President Sukarno by General Suharto.
- Father Vincent Pallotti (1796–1850), founder in 1835 of the Roman Catholic organization called the Pallottines, was elevated to sainthood by Pope John XXIII.
- Born:
  - David Baszucki, Canadian-born American entrepreneur, engineer, and software developer best known as the co-founder of Roblox and CEO of Roblox Corporation; in Winnipeg, Manitoba
  - Ingeborga Dapkūnaitė, Lithuanian actress; in Vilnius, Lithuanian SSR, Soviet Union

== January 21, 1963 (Monday) ==
- NASA Administrator James E. Webb and U.S. Defense Secretary Robert S. McNamara established a joint NASA-DOD Gemini Program Planning Board.
- Television Singapura started television test transmissions in Singapore.
- Born: Hakeem Olajuwon, Nigerian-American NBA player and Basketball Hall of Fame inductee; in Lagos

== January 22, 1963 (Tuesday) ==
- Addressing an Institute of Aerospace Science meeting in New York, George von Tiesenhausen, Chief of Future Studies at NASA's Launch Operations Center, stated that by 1970 the United States would need an orbiting space station to launch and repair spacecraft. The station could also serve as a crewed scientific laboratory. In describing the 91-metre (299 ft) long, 10-metre (33 ft) diameter structure, von Tiesenhausen said that the station could be launched in two sections using Saturn C-5 vehicles. The sections would be joined once in orbit.
- In Paris, President Charles de Gaulle of France and Chancellor Konrad Adenauer of West Germany signed the Elysée Treaty, the first bilateral pact between the French and German nations. "In the century prior to the treaty", it would be observed later, "France and Germany had been on opposite sides in three wars: the Franco-Prussian War, World War I and World War II." The treaty provided for the nations' leaders to meet at least twice a year, and the foreign and defense ministers to meet four times a year.
- McDonnell Aircraft Corporation reported to the MSC on its "white paint patch experiments" and their effect on temperature of the Mercury spacecraft. The recorded temperatures during the flights were cooler at points directly beneath the patch and on a corresponding point inside the spacecraft. McDonnell calculated that white painted spacecraft were advantageous for extended-range missions.
- Died: Ralph Hudson, 42, American murderer, became the last person to be executed by the U.S. state of New Jersey. Hudson had stabbed his wife to death after getting an early release for Christmas.

== January 23, 1963 (Wednesday) ==
- The Pascagoula (MS) Chronicle, whose publisher, Ira B. Harkey Jr., was alone among white newspaper owners in Mississippi in taking a stand against racial segregation, was saved from financial ruin when a newsman for the New York City radio station WNEW urged his listeners to subscribe to the paper. Dee Finch called attention to Harkey's courageous stand and loss of revenue, said that he was going to buy a subscription to the Chronicle, and invited others to do likewise. In the first day, 750 New Yorkers pledged to subscribe, and advertising agencies announced plans to encourage their clients to buy ad space in the newspaper.
- Three months after the U.S. and the USSR almost went to war during the Cuban Missile Crisis, the Turkish government announced the deactivation and removal of its arsenal of American-supplied Jupiter missiles from Turkey, six days after Italy had announced their phaseout of the Jupiters. The missiles in Turkey, armed with nuclear warheads and within striking distance of cities in the Soviet Union, had been one of the reasons for the Soviet placement of missiles in Cuba.
- British MI5 agent Kim Philby, who was secretly working for the Soviet Union as a double agent for the NKVD, disappeared after having a drink with a colleague at a hotel in Beirut. Five months later, on July 30, the Soviet Union would announce that he had been given asylum there and would confirm his identity as a Soviet spy.
- The Sino-Indian War formally came to an end after India's Parliament, the Lok Sabha, voted to approve the terms for peace with China, concluding the war between the world's two most populous nations. China had withdrawn its troops the previous month.
- A strike began at the Florida East Coast Railway and would become the longest in railroad history, not ending until nine years later on February 1, 1972. Strike activity would not completely end until April 9, 1976.
- The first democratic elections in the history of Kuwait took place, although limited to men only. There were 205 candidates for the 50 available seats in the National Assembly.
- Born: Su Tong (pseudonym for Tong Zhonggui), Chinese author; in Suzhou
- Died:
  - Gustave Garrigou, 78, French racing cyclist who won the 1911 Tour de France
  - Muhammad Ali Bogra, 53, 3rd Prime Minister of Pakistan from 1953 to 1955

== January 24, 1963 (Thursday) ==
- A B-52C bomber, carrying two nuclear weapons and on airborne alert for the U.S. Air Force, lost its vertical stabilizer in turbulence, broke up in midair and crashed into Elephant Mountain in Piscataquis County, Maine. Seven of the nine-man crew were killed, and one of the unarmed nuclear bombs fell from the plane and broke apart on impact on a farm. A part of that bomb, containing enriched uranium, was never located, "even though the waterlogged farmland in the vicinity was excavated to a depth of 50 feet".
- Died: Otto Harbach, 89, American lyricist and librettist

== January 25, 1963 (Friday) ==
- Speaking to the Canadian House of Commons on whether Canada would or would not accept nuclear weapons for its combat aircraft, Prime Minister John G. Diefenbaker made a speech that subsequent historians would describe as "most baffling", "next to incomprehensible" and full of "long, evasive, rambling... incoherent statements". "However," the Canadian Press (CP) would write, "at no point in his two-hour speech did Mr. Diefenbaker say definitely whether Canada has rejected or accepted a nuclear role for Canadian forces."
- A large annular solar eclipse covered over 99% of the Sun, creating a dramatic spectacle for observers in a narrow path at most 19.6 kilometres (12.2 mi) wide; it lasted just 25.24 seconds at the point of maximum eclipse.
- The lowest ever temperature in Kosovo (at the time part of Yugoslavia) was recorded in the city of Gjilan, −32.5 °C (−26.5 °F).
- Died: Sir Isaac Shoenberg, 78, Russian-born British inventor who pioneered the development of an all electronic television receiver.

== January 26, 1963 (Saturday) ==
- Specialty assignments were announced by the Manned Spacecraft Center for its astronaut team: L. Gordon Cooper, Alan B. Shepard, pilot phases of Project Mercury; Virgil I. Grissom, Project Gemini; John H. Glenn, Project Apollo; M. Scott Carpenter, lunar excursion training; Walter M. Schirra, Gemini and Apollo operations and training; and Donald K. Slayton, continuing as Coordinator of Astronaut Activities. Assignments of the nine new flight-crew members selected on September 17, 1962, were as follows: Neil A. Armstrong, trainers and simulators; Frank Borman, boosters; Charles Conrad, Jr., cockpit layout and systems integration; James A. Lovell, Jr., recovery systems; James A. McDivitt, guidance and navigation; Elliot M. See, Jr., electrical, sequential, and mission planning; Thomas P. Stafford, communications, instrumentation, and range integration; Edward H. White II, flight control systems; and John W. Young, environmental control systems, personal and survival equipment.
- The "British Pools Panel" was first used to address instances, in the betting on Britain's soccer football matches, where a scheduled match was postponed. On the first weekend, when 55 games were called off because of freezing temperatures, the panel of former players and referees "predicted" what the results would have been had the match not been postponed, essentially making up results that would be accepted for determining whether a betting line had been picked successfully. Originally, the five-member Panel only intervened if 30 or more matches were called off; later, the panel would convene if any match were postponed.
- The Rules Committee for American organized baseball voted unanimously (9–0) to increase the size of the strike zone beginning with the 1963 season. The new rule specified that a pitched ball was a strike if it traveled in the "space above home plate which is between the top of the batter's shoulders and his knees when he assumes his natural position". The prior rule in 1950 measured the zone from a player's armpits to the top of the knees. Although the number of walks decreased, so did the number of home runs, particularly in the American League, where attendance declined.
- The Shah of Iran's White Revolution of six reforms, including the right of women to vote, was overwhelmingly approved in a nationwide referendum by the six million male voters; the election was believed by observers to have been fraudulent.
- On Australia Day in Perth, Australia, two people were shot dead, and others injured, by multiple murderer Eric Edgar Cooke.
- Born:
  - José Mourinho, Portuguese-born professional soccer football team manager who has won league titles in four countries, for F.C. Porto in Portugal (2003, 2004); Chelsea F.C. in England (2005, 2006); Inter Milan in Italy (2009, 2010); and Real Madrid C.F. in Spain (2012), as well as two UEFA championships (2004, 2010); in Setúbal
  - Andrew Ridgeley, British singer for the 1980s pop duo Wham!; in Windlesham, Surrey
- Died:
  - Ole Olsen, 70, American vaudeville comedian, and half of the Olsen and Johnson comedy team. In 1938, Olsen and Chic Johnson had created the musical, and later the 1941 film, Hellzapoppin'.
  - Sir Maurice Hankey, 85, the first person to hold the post of Cabinet Secretary in the United Kingdom when it was created in 1916.

== January 27, 1963 (Sunday) ==
- Lee Harvey Oswald used the alias "A. J. Hidell" for the first time, ordering a .38 caliber Smith & Wesson revolver through the mail from Seaport Traders, Inc., of Los Angeles. He would use the Hidell name in ordering other weapons, including the Mannlicher–Carcano rifle that would be used in November to kill U.S. President Kennedy.
- The Aero Commander 1121 business jet made its first test flight, at Norman, Oklahoma. In 1968, the manufacturing rights would be sold to Israeli Aircraft Industries (IAI), now Israel Aerospace Industries, which manufactured the jets under the name Westwind.
- Born: Søren Gade, Danish Speaker of the Folketing since 2022; in Holstebro
- Died: Princess Adisaya Suriyabha, 73, member of the Thai royal family (a daughter of Chulalongkorn, King Rama V of Siam)

== January 28, 1963 (Monday) ==
- African American student Harvey Gantt entered Clemson University in South Carolina, the last U.S. state to hold out against racial integration. "South Carolina is the only state," the Associated Press reported, "which, to this day, had preserved segregation in public schools at all levels." Gantt's entry into the university was described as peaceful, and it was reported that "On the surface, Gantt was being treated by students and college officials alike as just another newcomer." Most South Carolina public schools did not integrate until the 1970s.
- The fourth, and final, book by author J. D. Salinger was published. Raise High the Roof Beam, Carpenters and Seymour: An Introduction were two novellas put together in one novel, which had both previously appeared in print in the magazine The New Yorker.
- The city of Vista, California, was incorporated.
- Died: John Farrow, 58, Australian born American film director and winner of 1957 Academy Award for his screenplay in Around the World in Eighty Days, died of a heart attack.

== January 29, 1963 (Tuesday) ==
- At a launch guidance and control coordination meeting on January 29 and 30, The Aerospace Corporation described three Titan II development flight failures that had been caused by problems in the General Electrical Mod III airborne radio guidance system. Although these failures did not appear to be the result of inherent design faults that might react on the Gemini program, Aerospace felt that a tighter quality assurance program was needed: "GE has a poor MOD III (G) quality control program, basically poor workmanship."
- France vetoed the United Kingdom's application for entry into the Western Europe's European Economic Community (EEC), known as the "Common Market". The move had been hinted at earlier by President Charles de Gaulle earlier. Since admission to the Common Market would have required a unanimous vote of the member nations, Foreign Minister Maurice Couve de Murville moved to adjourn negotiations indefinitely. The UK would be admitted to the Common Market on January 1, 1973, almost ten years later.
- The first inductees into the Pro Football Hall of Fame at Canton, Ohio, were announced.
- Born: Octavian Teodorescu, Romanian rock musician and composer who performs under the stage name "Octave"; in Bucharest
- Died:
  - Robert Frost, 88, popular American poet and four-time Pulitzer Prize winner
  - Lee "Specs" Meadows, 68, American MLB baseball pitcher who led the National League in wins in 1926 and who was one of the first players to wear glasses while playing.

== January 30, 1963 (Wednesday) ==
- The U.S. State Department took the unusual step of issuing a press release critical of one of America's closest allies, in rebuttal to the speech by Canadian Prime Minister Diefenbaker about his nation's Canadian nuclear policy. Responding to Diefenbaker's January 25 statement that the two nations had been negotiating for "two to three months or more", the U.S. statement said that "the Canadian Government has not as yet proposed any arrangement sufficiently practical to contribute effectively to North American defense". Diefenbaker accused the U.S. of interfering with Canada's domestic affairs and temporarily recalled the Canadian ambassador from Washington. U.S. Secretary of State Dean Rusk would issue an apology two days later for the tone of the comments, which The New York Times described as "ill-considered and unusually blunt".
- Gemini Project Office asked NASA Headquarters for authorization to use preflight automatic checkout equipment for Project Gemini. The Mercury Program had been successful in everything except meeting schedules, in which lengthy checkout time was a major obstacle. Automatic checkout equipment cut down the time required to test components in Gemini. MSC flight mission director George M. Low asked that four automatic checkout stations be provided for Project Gemini as quickly as possible. Initially approved, the use of automatic checkout equipment in the Gemini program would subsequently be dropped as an economy measure.
- Died:
  - Edward A. Carter, Jr., 46, African-American U.S. Army sergeant who would be posthumously given the Medal of Honor for his heroism shown on March 23, 1945, died from lung cancer. Carter, unfairly accused of being a Communist, was shunned by the Army after World War II, and the medal would not be voted for him by Congress until 34 years after his death.
  - Sir Pelham Warner, 89, English cricketer known as "The Grand Old Man of English Cricket"; English National team captain in 1903–04 and 1905–06; President of MCC; author and founder of The Cricketer magazine.
  - Francis Poulenc, 64, French composer

== January 31, 1963 (Thursday) ==
- Major General H. W. G. Wijeyekoon resigned as Commander of the Ceylon Army.
- Mexico announces its bid for the 1968 Summer Olympics.
