= Pierlucio Tinazzi =

Italian security guard

- Born: December 27, 1962; Morgex, Aosta Valley Italy
- Died: March 24, 1999 (aged 36); Mont Blanc
- Occupation: Security guard
- Known for: Dying while trying to rescue survivors of the 1999 Mont Blanc tunnel fire

Pierlucio Tinazzi (Italian pronunciation: [ˌpjɛrˈluːtʃo tiˈnattsi]; 27 December 1962 – 24 March 1999) was an Italian security guard who died while trying to rescue victims of the 1999 Mont Blanc tunnel fire. Tinazzi was on the French side of the tunnel, from where he donned breathing equipment and drove into the tunnel on his BMW K75 motorcycle in an attempt to save people trapped in the tunnel; after finding unconscious truck driver Maurice Lebras, who was too heavy to be loaded on his motorcycle, he dragged him to a refuge station in the tunnel, where both were killed by smoke or flames. Tinazzi was in radio contact with the Italian side for over an hour before succumbing to the intense heat, which caused his motorcycle to melt into the pavement.

Having died trying to save another man, Tinazzi was lauded as a hero, buried with honors, and posthumously awarded Italy's Medaglia d'Oro al Valore Civile (Gold Medal for Civil Valor). He was also given a special gold medal by the motorcycle sport governing body Fédération Internationale de Motocyclisme (FIM). A commemorative plaque at the Italian entrance honours his sacrifice.

For several years, Tinazzi was believed to have saved between ten and twelve people by ferrying them to safety on his motorcycle before dying in the fire. However, in 2019, a writer researching the story found that according to French police reports, motorcycle security guard Patrick Devouassoux, who survived the fire, saved several people while driving a Renault Express minivan. Tinazzi's and Devouassoux's actions were apparently intermingled in subsequent press accounts.
