= Mont Blanc Tunnel fire =

Transport truck fire in the Mont Blanc Tunnel

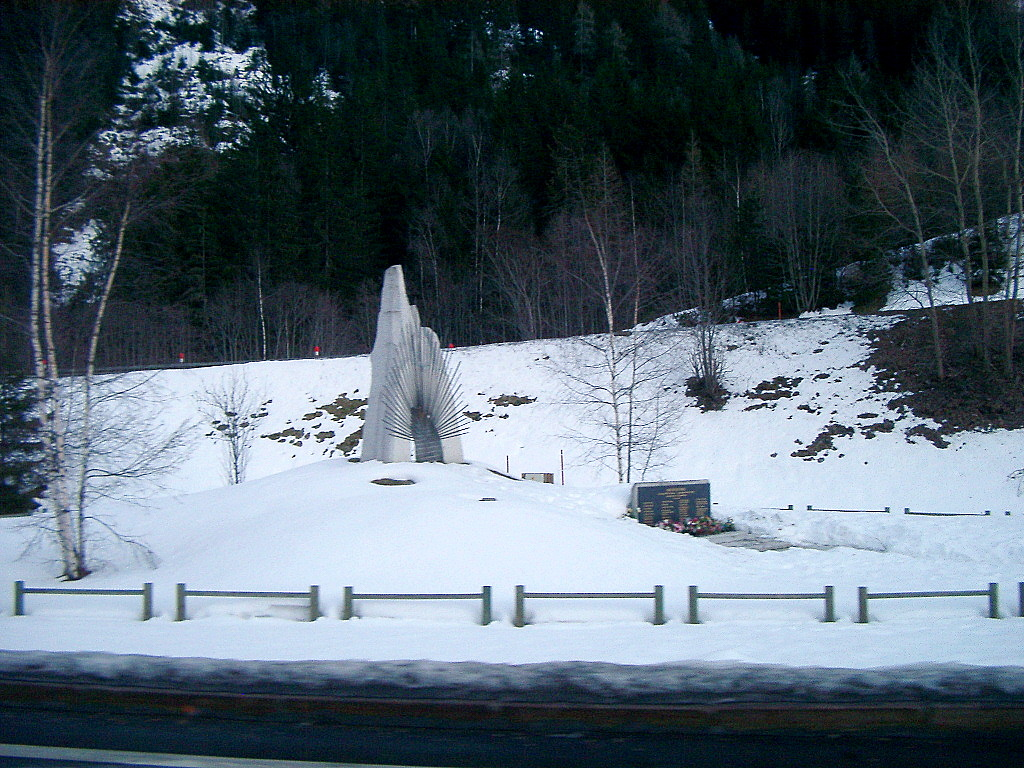
- A memorial plaque on the French side of the tunnel; pictured in 2010.
- Date: 24 March 1999; 27 years ago
- Venue: Mont Blanc Tunnel
- Location: Chamonix, Haute-Savoie, France; 45.85451°N 6.912534°E
- Type: Fire
- Deaths: 39
- Injuries: 14

On 24 March 1999, a transport truck caught fire while driving through the Mont Blanc Tunnel between France and Italy. When it stopped halfway through the tunnel, it violently combusted. Other vehicles in the tunnel quickly became trapped and caught fire as firefighters could not reach the transport truck. 39 people were killed. In the aftermath, major changes were made to the tunnel to improve its safety.

== Fire ==
On the morning of 24 March 1999, a refrigerated trailer and Volvo FH12 tractor truck, driven by Gilbert Degrave and carrying flour and margarine, entered from the French side of the tunnel. The truck came through the tollbooth at 10:46 CET. The initial journey through the tunnel was routine.

According to the National Geographic documentary programme Seconds from Disaster, the fire and smoke appeared at around 10:49. Shortly after, the driver realized something was wrong as cars coming in the opposite direction flashed their headlights at him; a glance in his mirrors showed white smoke coming from under his cabin. This was not yet considered a fire emergency. In fact, in the previous 35 years, there had been 16 other truck fires in the tunnel, all extinguished on the spot by the drivers.

At 10:53, Degrave stopped 6 kilometres (3.7 mi) into the 11.6 kilometres (7.2 mi) tunnel to attempt to fight the fire, but was forced back when the payload suddenly burst into flames. He abandoned his vehicle and ran to the Italian entrance of the tunnel.

At 10:54, a driver called from refuge 22 to raise the alarm. At 10:55, tunnel employees triggered the fire alarm and stopped further traffic from entering. At this point, there were at least 10 cars and 18 trucks in the tunnel that entered from the French side. A few vehicles from the Italian side passed the Volvo truck without stopping. Some cars from the French side managed to turn around in the narrow two-lane tunnel to retreat back to France, but navigating the road in the dense smoke that rapidly filled the tunnel quickly made this impossible.

Between 10:53 and 10:57, the smoke had covered half a kilometre of the French side. The larger trucks were stranded, as they had insufficient space to turn around, and reversing out was not an option.

Most drivers rolled up their windows and waited for rescue. The ventilation system in the tunnel drove toxic smoke back down the tunnel faster than anyone could run to safety. These fumes quickly filled the tunnel and restricted oxygen, disabling vehicles including fire engines which, once affected, had to be abandoned by the firefighters. Many drivers near the blaze who attempted to leave their cars and seek refuge points were quickly overcome due to toxic components of the smoke, mainly hydrogen cyanide.

At 10:57 and 10:59, two fire trucks from Chamonix responded to the unfolding disaster. Melted wiring had eliminated any light sources in the tunnel; in the smoke and with abandoned and wrecked vehicles blocking their path, both fire engines could not proceed, and were blocked at garage 17, 1,200 metres (3,900 ft) from the burning truck. With no other possibility, they abandoned their vehicles and took refuge in two emergency fire cubicles (fire-door sealed small rooms set in the walls every 600 metres (2,000 ft)).

Between 10:57 and 11:01, Italian firefighters came within 300 metres of the truck, with two of them able to proceed to garage 21. They could see the burning truck. However, burning fuel flowed down the road surface, causing tyres and fuel tanks to explode and sending deadly shrapnel in the air, thus spreading fire to other vehicles. This forced the Italian firefighters to retreat, although they were able to rescue 12 people from the Italian side.

At 11:10 six Chamonix firefighters entered the tunnel but were blocked at the garage 17, 2,700 metres (8,900 ft) from the truck. By 11:11, more Italian firefighters had come to tackle the fire. They were blocked at garage 22 and also had to abandon their vehicles. They then searched for trapped groups of firefighters who had taken refuge in the fire cubicles. When it was realized that the cubicles were offering little protection from the smoke, they began searching for the doors that led to the ventilation duct.

By 11:30, 37 minutes after the start of the fire, smoke reached the French entrance of the tunnel, 6 kilometres (3.7 mi) from the truck. At 11:39, another team of firefighters entered the tunnel from the French side but were blocked at the garage 5, 4,800 metres (15,700 ft) from the truck.

All the firefighters were rescued five hours later by a third fire crew that responded and reached them via a ventilation duct; of the 15 firefighters who had been trapped, 14 were in serious condition and one (their commanding officer) later died in the hospital.

The fire burned for fifty-three hours and is estimated to have reached a temperature of 1,000 °C (1,830 °F), mainly due to the margarine load in the trailer, equivalent to a 23,000-litre (5,100 imp gal; 6,100 US gal) oil tanker. The fire spread to other cargo vehicles nearby that also carried combustible loads. The fire trapped around 40 vehicles in dense and poisonous smoke containing carbon monoxide and hydrogen cyanide. Due to weather conditions, air flowed through the tunnel from the Italian side to the French side. Authorities compounded the chimney effect by pumping in more fresh air from the Italian side, escalating the fire while trapping toxic fumes inside. Only vehicles past the fire on the French side of the tunnel were trapped, while cars on the Italian side of the fire were largely unaffected.

There were 29 deaths of people trapped inside of vehicles, and nine more died trying to escape on foot. All of the deceased were on the French side, and were ultimately reduced to bones and ash by the intense heat. Of the initial fifty people trapped by the fire, twelve survived, all of them from the Italian side. Some victims were able to escape to the fire cubicles. The original fire doors on the cubicles were rated to survive for two hours. Some had been upgraded in the thirty-four years since construction of the Mont Blanc Tunnel to survive for four hours.

It was more than five days before the tunnel cooled sufficiently to start repairs.

== Aftermath ==
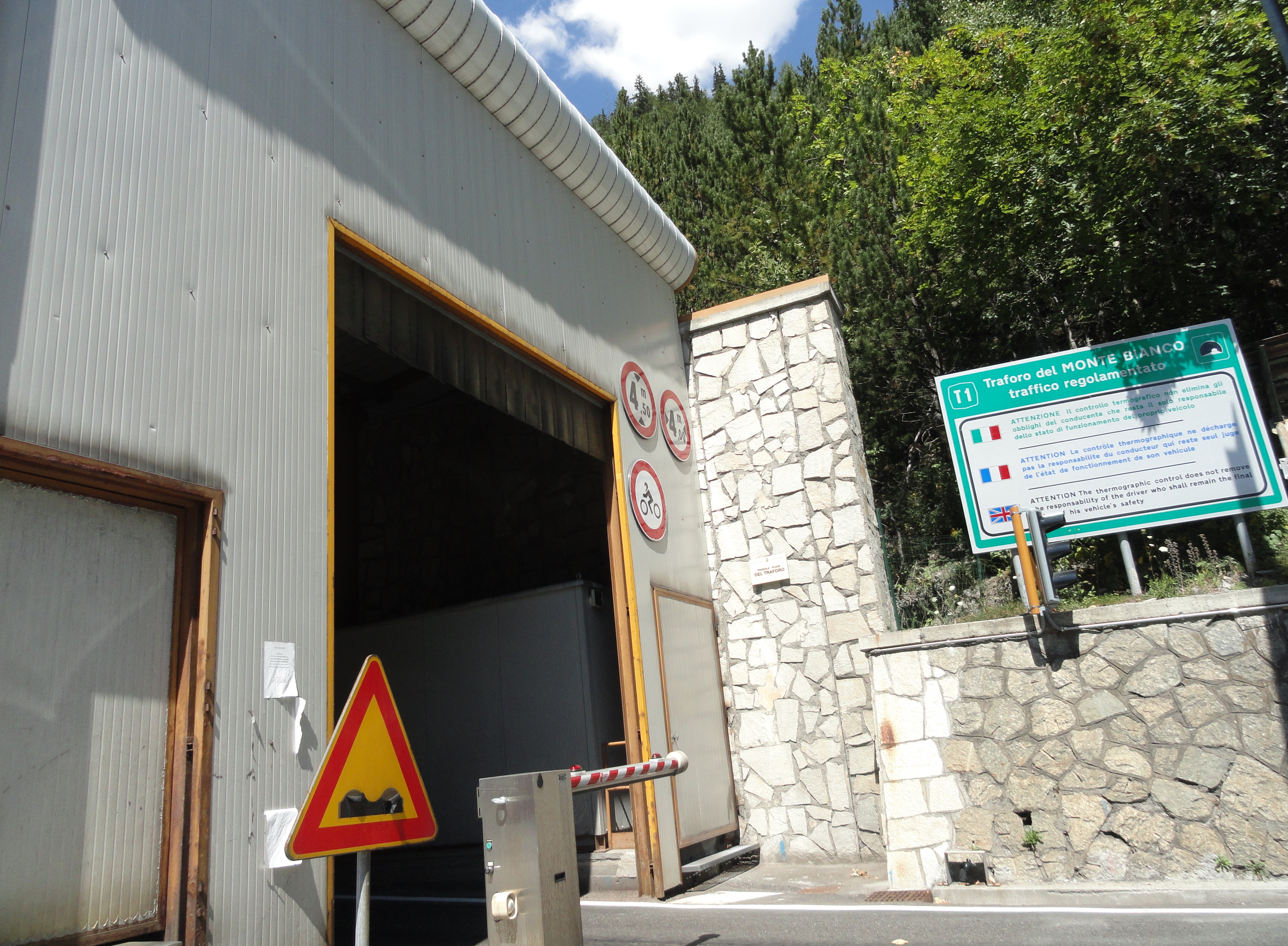
Thermographic inspection station on the Italian side

The tunnel underwent major changes in the three years it remained closed after the fire. Renovations include computerized detection equipment, extra security bays, a parallel escape shaft and a fire station in the middle of the tunnel complete with double-cabbed fire trucks. The safety shafts also have clean air flowing through them via vents. Any people in the security bays now have video contact with the control centre, so they can communicate with the people trapped inside and inform them about what is happening in the tunnel more clearly.

A remote site for cargo safety inspection was created on each side: Aosta in Italy and Passy-Le Fayet in France. Here, all trucks are inspected well before the tunnel entrance. These remote sites are also used as staging areas, to smooth the peaks of commercial traffic.

The experience gained from the investigation into the fire was one of the principal factors that led to the creation of the French Land Transport Accident Investigation Bureau.

TV documentaries were also made concerning the disaster, all distributed worldwide and focusing on either safety aspects or the circumstances that turned what should have been a serious, but controllable incident into a disaster. The first, Seconds from Disaster – Tunnel Inferno, airing in 2004, was a reconstruction of the events leading up to and during the disaster and the conclusions of the investigation that followed. The second, Into the Flames – Fire Underground, airing in 2006, revisited the circumstances and showed how new technology in the form of a new type of fire extinguisher could have reduced the scale of the disaster and enabled the fire service to reach and remain in the vicinity to fight the fire.

Pierlucio Tinazzi, an Italian security guard who died attempting to rescue a truck driver, was posthumously awarded Italy's Medaglia d'Oro al Valore Civile (Gold Medal for Civil Valor).

The accident prompted the re-evaluation of tunnel safety across Europe. In the Queensway and Kingsway Tunnels in Merseyside, Liverpool, emergency refuge points were established along the length of the tunnel, including the main section below the road deck.

== Manslaughter trial ==
In Grenoble, France, 16 people and companies were tried on 31 January 2005 for manslaughter. Defendants in the trial included:

- Gilbert Degrave, the Belgian driver of the truck that caught fire in the tunnel
- Volvo, the truck's manufacturer
- The French and Italian managers of the tunnel
- ATMB and SITMB
- Safety regulators
- The Mayor of Chamonix
- A senior official of the French Ministry of Public Works

The exact cause of the fire is disputed. One account reported it to be a cigarette stub carelessly thrown at the truck, which supposedly entered the engine induction snorkel above the cabin, setting the paper air filter on fire. Others blamed a mechanical or electrical fault, or poor maintenance of the truck's engine. An investigation found no evidence of a design fault with the truck. The closest smoke detector was out of order, and French emergency services did not use the same radio frequency as those inside the tunnel.

The Italian company responsible for operating the tunnel, SITMB, paid €13.5 million ($17.5 million US) to a fund for the families of the victims. Édouard Balladur, former president of the French company operating the tunnel (from 1968 to 1980), and later Prime Minister of France, underwent a witness examination. He was asked about the security measures that he ordered, or did not order, to be carried out.

Balladur claimed that the catastrophe could be attributed to the fact the tunnel had been divided into two sections operated by two companies (one in France, the other in Italy), which failed to coordinate the situation. On 27 July 2005, thirteen defendants were found guilty, and received sentences ranging from fines to suspended prison sentences to six months in jail:

- Gérard Roncoli, the head of security at the tunnel, was convicted and sentenced to six months in jail plus an additional two-year suspended sentence, the heaviest sentence levied against any of the defendants. The sentence was upheld on appeal.
- Remy Chardon, former president of the French company operating the tunnel, was convicted and received a two-year suspended jail term; he was also fined approximately US$18,000.
- Gilbert Degrave, the driver of the truck, received a four-month suspended sentence.
- Seven other people, including the tunnel's Italian security chief, received suspended terms and fines.
- Three companies were fined up to US$180,000 each.
- The charges against Volvo were dropped.

== See also ==
- List of transportation fires
