= United Nations General Assembly Resolution 1803 (XVII) =

UN General Assembly Resolution 1803
- Date: 14 December 1962
- Code: A/RES/1803 (XVII)
- Voting summary: 87 voted for; 2 voted against; 12 abstained

United Nations General Assembly Resolution 1803 established the principle of permanent sovereignty over natural resources.

Adopted on 14 December 1962 by the UN General Assembly, resolution proclaims in particular that:

the right of people's and nations to permanent sovereignty over their wealth and resources must be exercised in the interest of their national development and the well-being of the people of the State concerned.

At the same time the resolution seeks to find a middle ground between countries' own decisions to regulate their assets and Western world's demand for stronger protection of foreign investments.

== Impact ==
The resolution has been invoked in international arbitrations, national court rulings, government decrees and diplomatic protests. Among them is Decree No. 1 of the United Nations Council for Namibia adopted to provide the people of Namibia adequate protection of their natural resources.
