= Valdiodio N'diaye =

Senegalese politician

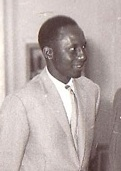
- Valdiodio Ndiaye in 1960

Minister of Finance
- In office November 1962 – December 18, 1962
- Preceded by: André Peytavin
- Succeeded by: Daniel Cabou

Mayor of Kaolack
- In office 15 May 1960 – 18 December 1962
- Preceded by: Ibrahima Seydou Ndaw
- Succeeded by: Thierno Diop

Minister of the Interior
- In office 18 May 1957 – November 1962
- Preceded by: none
- Succeeded by: Mamadou Dia

Personal details
- Born: 7 April 1923 Rufisque, French West Africa (France)
- Died: 5 May 1984 (aged 61)
- Party: Socialist Party
- Education: University of Montpellier
- Occupation: Lawyer

Valdiodio N'diaye (April 7, 1923 - May 5, 1984) was a Senegalese lawyer and politician who served as the Senegal’s Minister of Finance from 1960 to 1962 and the Senegal’s Minister of the Interior from 1962 until his arrest later that year.

== Early life and education ==
Valdiodio was born on April 7, 1923 in Rufisque, he was born into the family of Linguère Adiaratou Sira M'Bodj, from the Guelwar Serer, and Samba-Langar N'Diaye who was the prince of the Kingdom of Saloum. He grew up in Kaolack where he attended primary school before he did his secondary studies at the Faidherbe high school in Saint-Louis. In 1947, he enrolled in law and philosophy at the University of Montpellier and earned a Doctorate in law in 1951.
