= May 1962 =

Month of 1962

<<	May 1962					>>
Su	Mo	Tu	We	Th	Fr	Sa
		1	2	3	4	5
6	7	8	9	10	11	12
13	14	15	16	17	18	19
20	21	22	23	24	25	26
27	28	29	30	31

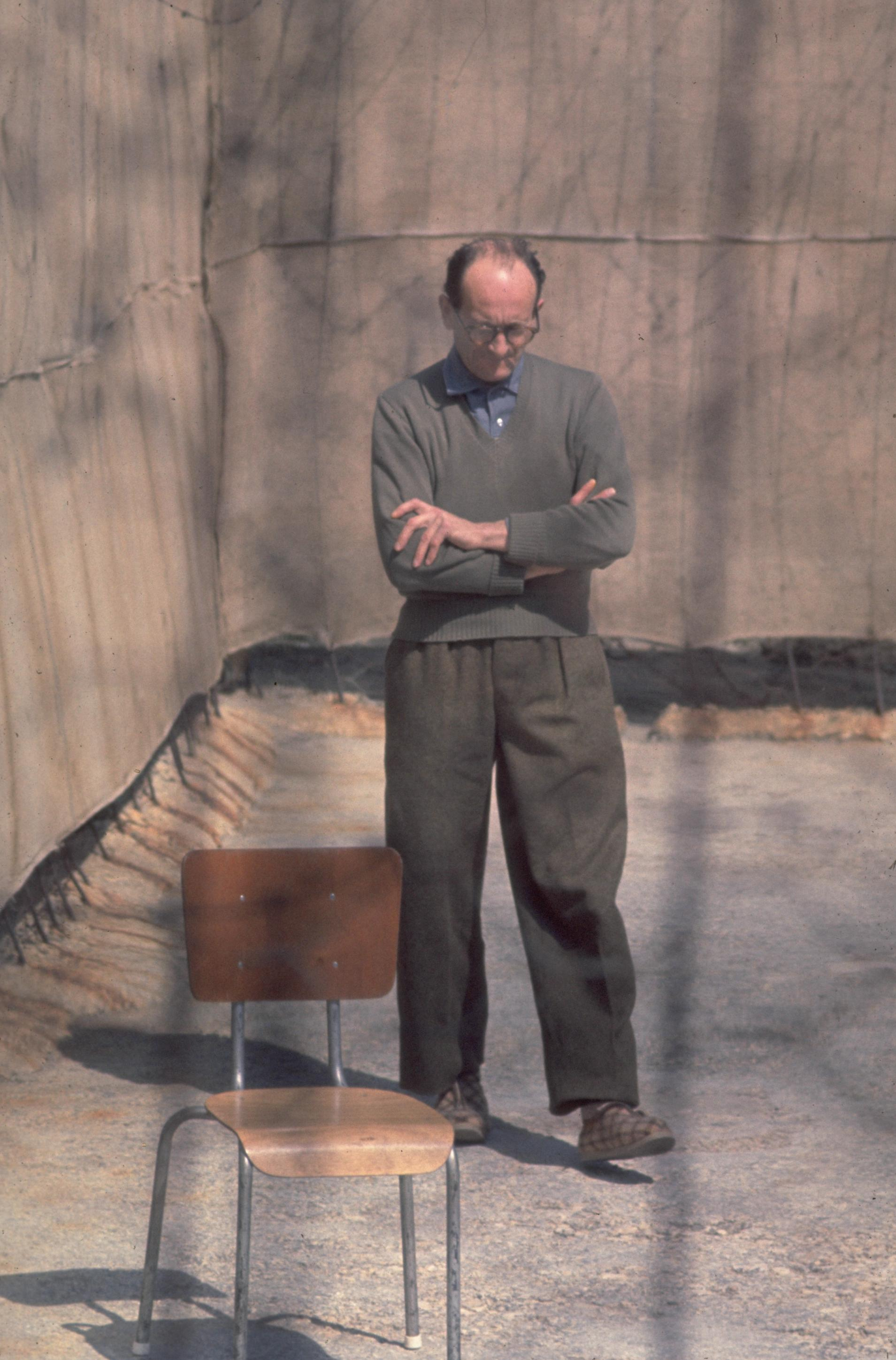
May 31, 1962: Adolf Eichmann, shown in Ramle Prison in Israel while awaiting execution, is hanged

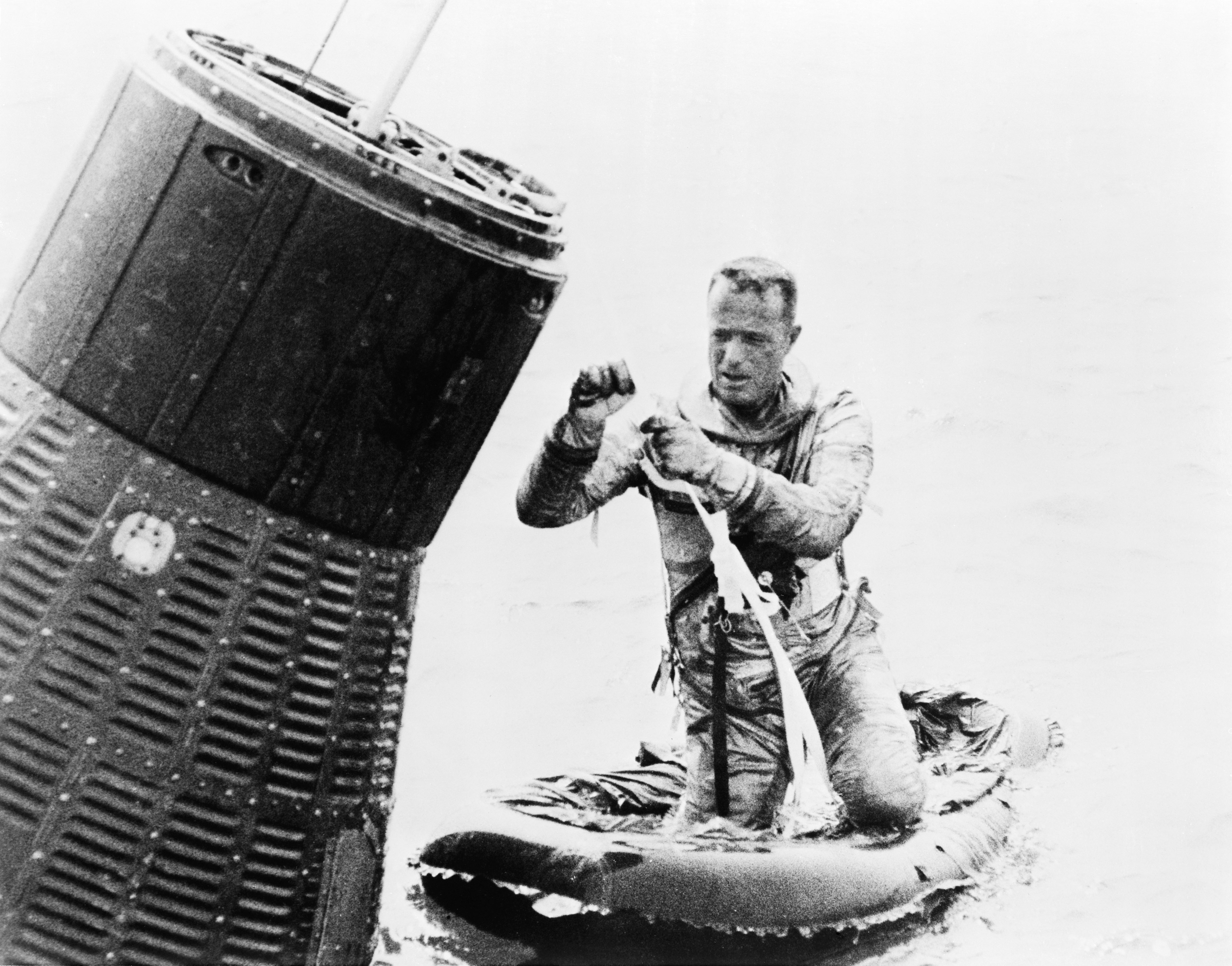
May 24, 1962: Astronaut Scott Carpenter orbits Earth, overshoots landing zone by 250 miles

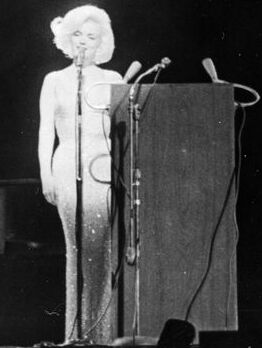
May 19, 1962: Marilyn Monroe sings to President Kennedy

The following events occurred in May 1962:

== May 1, 1962 (Tuesday) ==
- The Dayton Hudson Corporation opened the first of its Target discount stores. The store (now a "SuperTarget") is located at 1515 West County Road B in Roseville, Minnesota, a suburb of Minneapolis–Saint Paul.
- Norwich City F.C. won the English Football League Cup, beating Rochdale F.C. 1 to 0 in the second leg of the two-game final after having defeated them 3 to 0 at Rochdale on April 26, for an aggregate score of 4 to 0.
- The U.S. Air Force awarded a contract to Lockheed for to build eight Gemini Agena target vehicles (GATV), to be designed to provide a stable target for docking spacecraft, and able to respond to commands from ground stations or spacecraft. NASA and Lockheed agreed on a full pulse-code-modulation (PCM) for the Gemini program. Ten sites were selected for the installation of PCM equipment.
- Died: Sir Sydney Cockerell, 94, English curator and art collector

== May 2, 1962 (Wednesday) ==
- The value of the Canadian dollar was put at a fixed exchange rate at 92.5 United States cents (US$0.925) after having had a fluctuating value since September 30, 1950. The Canadian Exchange Fund would purchase U.S. dollars in order to keep the Canadian dollar from going more than one percent above 92 1/2¢ American, until May 30, 1970.
- Benfica (of Lisbon), champion of Portugal's Primeira Divisão league, won the European Cup for the second time in a row, beating Real Madrid (champions of Spain's La Liga), 5 to 3, before a crowd of 61,257 at Amsterdam's Olympisch Stadion.
- An OAS car bomb killed 96 people when it exploded at the docks of Algiers. The deaths of 14 other people and the injury of 147 overall made the occasion "the bloodiest single day in the modern history of Algeria's capital".
- Born:
  - Ty Herndon, American country music singer; in Meridian, Mississippi
  - Elizabeth Berridge, American actress; in New Rochelle, New York
  - Jimmy "Whirlwind" White, English snooker player; in Tooting, London
- Died: Clairvius Narcisse, 40, Haitian peasant who would attain media attention in 1980 as being the identity of a zombie after his death.

== May 3, 1962 (Thursday) ==
- A railway crash involving three separate trains killed 160 people in Japan near the Mikawashima Station at Arkawawa, a ward of Tokyo. Engineer Norifumi Minakami drove a freight train through a red signal and sideswiped a commuter train. As surviving passengers climbed out of that train, a third train ran through them, then plunged over an embankment.
- British supermarket executive Alan Sainsbury, CEO of the Sainsbury's Supermarkets chain of grocery stores, was created a life peer in the House of Lords, with the title Baron Sainsbury.

== May 4, 1962 (Friday) ==
- U.S. Ambassador to Canada Livingston Merchant, in his final month as envoy, made a final visit to Prime Minister John Diefenbaker in Ottawa. At the meeting Diefenbaker angrily brought out an American memorandum that had been left behind during President Kennedy's visit in May 1961. The President's handwritten notes in the margin included the letters "OAS" (the Organization of American States), "but Diefenbaker read Kennedy's handwriting as 'SOB'," and threatened to use the memo (and the suggestion that Kennedy thought that Diefenbaker was a "son of a bitch") in the upcoming June 18 elections. After conferring with his superiors, the ambassador later told Diefenbaker that he was personally reluctant to report "anything which could be construed as a threat" and that publication of the memo would "make difficult future relations". The memo was never used, but Kennedy and Diefenbaker never trusted each other again.
- Dr. Masaki Watanabe of Japan performed the very first arthroscopic surgery to repair a meniscus tear, a common injury for athletes. The first patient to receive the procedure was a 17-year-old basketball player, who was returned to playing six weeks after the meniscectomy and resection of his right knee by Dr. Watanabe.
- During the El Carupanazo revolt against Venezuelan President Rómulo Betancourt, Venezuelan Air Force aircraft began a two-day attack on rebel positions at Carúpano.
- Scott Carpenter, designated as the primary pilot for the Mercury-Atlas 7 (MA-7) crewed orbital flight, completed a simulated MA-7 mission exercise.

== May 5, 1962 (Saturday) ==
- Seattle businessman Stanley McDonald inaugurated a cruise ship service that would eventually become Princess Cruises, starting with the departure of the Canadian steamer SS Yarmouth from San Francisco for the first of 17 ten-day cruises to the 1962 Seattle World's Fair and back. After a successful six-month lease of the Yarmouth, McDonald would spend more than three years in making plans for the Princess Cruise line (which would be made famous by The Love Boat television series) on a regular series of winter tours from Los Angeles to Acapulco, starting at the end of 1965.
- Tottenham Hotspur F.C. retained the FA Cup with a 3–1 win over Burnley F.C. in front of 100,000 fans (including Queen Elizabeth II and Prince Philip) at Wembley Stadium, and became only the second team in Football League history to win the Cup two years in a row. Goals were scored for the Spurs by Jimmy Greaves, Bobby Smith and captain Danny Blanchflower, with the Clarets' sole score coming from Jimmy Robson.

== May 6, 1962 (Sunday) ==
- Antonio Segni was elected President of the Italian Republic on the ninth round of balloting by the combined houses of Italian Parliament, and after four days of voting. In the first round, Segni of the Democrazia Cristiana (DC) party was pitted against three other candidates, Giuseppe Saragat (Partito Socialista Democratico Italiano (PSDI); Umberto Terracini of the Italian Communist Party (P.C.I.); and Sandro Pertini of the Partito Socialista Italiano (PSI), with no candidate receiving at least two-thirds of the vote in on the first three ballots. After Terracini and Pertini dropped out, and a 50 percent rather than two-thirds majority determined the choice, Segni defeated Saragat, 443 votes to 334.
- The first nuclear explosion to be caused by an American ballistic missile, rather than by a bomb dropped from an aircraft or at a fixed site, was accomplished at Christmas Island, 1,200 miles (1,900 km) from its launch site. Previous ICBM tests had been done without a nuclear warhead. The USS Ethan Allen fired the armed Polaris A-2 missile, from underwater, to its target.
- Martin de Porres (1579–1639) of Peru was canonized as the first mixed-race Roman Catholic saint, 125 years after his beatification. The son of a Spanish nobleman father and a freed slave mother of African and Indian descent, Porres was designated as the patron saint of mixed-race individuals, barbers, innkeepers, and public health workers.
- The National Bowling League rolled its last game, with the Detroit Thunderbirds defeating the Twin Cities Skippers, 27–15, to sweep the best 3-of-five "World Series of Bowling" for the first, and only, NBL championship.
- Born: N. J. Burkett, American correspondent for WABC-TV since 1989, best known for his coverage on the 9/11 terrorist attacks; in Orange, New Jersey
- Died: Thomas Gilcrease, 72, American philanthropist and collector of indigenous artifacts of the Americas

== May 7, 1962 (Monday) ==
- Three officials of the Central Intelligence Agency met with U.S. Attorney General Robert F. Kennedy and implored him to stop investigation of Mafia crime boss Sam Giancana. For the first time, the CIA revealed that it had offered $150,000 to several organized criminals to carry out a "hit" against Cuba's Prime Minister, Fidel Castro. The secret meeting would become public in 1975, with the release of the Rockefeller Commission's report on an investigation of the CIA.
- The six-member township council of Centralia, Pennsylvania, voted in favor of improving the new landfill at the edge of town, in time for Memorial Day ceremonies. Every year, the contents of the city dump would be set afire, despite a state law prohibiting the practice, and the May 27 burning would prove to be the end of Centralia.
- Detroit became the first city in the United States to use traffic cameras and electronic signs to regulate the flow of traffic. The pilot program began with 14 television cameras along a 3.2-mile (5.1 km) stretch of the John C. Lodge Freeway, between the Davison Expressway and Interstate 94.
- NASA announced that the Mercury 7 flight would be delayed several days due to problems with the Atlas rocket. Scott Carpenter would be launched on May 24.
- The 1962 Cannes Film Festival opened.

== May 8, 1962 (Tuesday) ==
- The Broadway musical A Funny Thing Happened on the Way to the Forum, with music and lyrics by Stephen Sondheim, had the first of 964 performances. Set in ancient Rome, and inspired by the comedies of Titus Maccius Plautus (254 BC–184 BC), it would close on August 29, 1964, and be adapted as a film as well.
- J. Paul Austin became the new President of The Coca-Cola Company. During his 19-year tenure, Coca-Cola's annual worldwide sales would grow ten-fold, from $567 million to $5.9 billion.
- Brian Epstein visited the HMV (EMI) store at 363 Oxford Street, London, to have The Beatles' Decca audition tape transferred to 78 rpm acetates.
- Francisco Orlich Bolmarcich was inaugurated for a four-year term as the 36th President of Costa Rica, succeeding Mario Echandi Jiménez.
- Died: Alfred Madsen, 74, Norwegian engineer, newspaper editor, trade unionist and politician

== May 9, 1962 (Wednesday) ==
- At the request of the U.S. Department of State, the Immigration and Naturalization Service agreed to issue a United States visa to Marina Prusakova Oswald so that she could accompany her husband, Lee Harvey Oswald, on his return to the United States.
- The lunar crater Albategnius became the first area of the moon to be illuminated by a laser beam from Earth. Scientists Louis Smullin and Giorgio Fiocco of MIT aimed the beam and then observed it.
- The Beatles signed their first recording contract, with Parlophone, after Brian Epstein persuaded George Martin to sign them, sight unseen.
- The Sikorsky S-64 Skycrane helicopter, capable of lifting 20,000 pounds (over 9,000 kg), made its first flight.
- Princess Marie-Christine of Belgium was confirmed by Bishop Fulton Sheen.
- Born: Dave Gahan, English singer-songwriter and lead singer of electronic band Depeche Mode; in North Weald, Essex

== May 10, 1962 (Thursday) ==
- Pravda, the official newspaper for the Soviet Communist Party, printed the official response to pleas to prevent the continued tearing down of Moscow's monasteries and churches. The plea had been in an editorial in the magazine Moskva about the urban renewal decisions of the Architectural Planning Administration. The editorials were unsigned, but apparently approved by First Secretary Khrushchev. The day before, three of the journalists from Moskva were informed that the article was anti-Soviet.
- The Japanese monster film Mothra opened in the United States, after having premiered in Japan on July 30, 1961.
- NASA's John C. Fischer, Jr. of Lewis Research Center, proposed a two-phased plan for a U.S. space station program. The first phase, which would take at least four years, would be to send a fully equipped station into orbit with a crew, while the second phase would have regular supply by placing an inflatable structure into orbit to be resupplied by ferry vehicles.
- Gemini Project Office directed McDonnell to determine what special pressure suit features would be required to allow crew members to take a "walk in space" of up to 15 minutes outside of an orbiting capsule. During all Gemini flights, measurements would be made of each crewmember's blood pressure, heart activity, galvanic skin response, and body temperature. The bioinstrumentation devices would add 3.5 pounds (1.6 kg) per crewmember, with a total power consumption of about 2 watt-hours (7.2 kJ). A postlanding survival kit weighing 24 pounds (11 kg) would be provided for each crew member.
- Born: John Ngugi, Kenyan athlete and 1988 Olympic gold medalist in the 5000 metre race; in Nyahururu

== May 11, 1962 (Friday) ==
- Students at Orange County State College (later California State University, Fullerton) staged what was billed as "The First Intercollegiate Elephant Race in Human History", with 15 elephants raced through different events in Fullerton, California. Winners in various weight ranges included "Kinney" of Long Beach State College and "Captain Hook" of Orange Coast College.
- In accepting the Sylvanus Thayer Award, retired General Douglas MacArthur delivered his memorable "Duty, Honor, Country" speech to West Point cadets. The 82-year-old MacArthur delivered the 30-minute address from memory and without notes, and a recording of the remarks would be released as a record album later.
- Died: Hans Luther, 83, Chancellor of Germany from 1925 to 1926

== May 12, 1962 (Saturday) ==
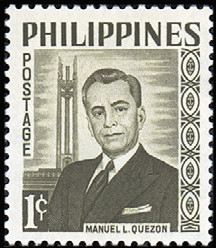
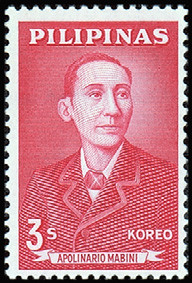
The 1960 and 1962 Philippine postage stamps
- The Philippines continued to distance itself from its past as an American protectorate, changing its name on postage and coinage to Pilipinas.
- In the U.S., nine men on a fishing trip were killed by sharks after their boat sank off the coast of Newport Beach, California. Chester McMain of Norwalk was taking the Happy Jack on its first voyage when it ran into rough weather. Though the men were wearing life jackets, the sharks apparently pulled them underwater. Searchers on the fishing boat Mardic located six bodies the next day and found sharks swimming around the group.
- James E. Webb, the new Administrator of NASA, found that Project Gemini cost estimates had exceeded the original $250,000,000 estimate and almost tripled to $747,000,000. Spacecraft cost rose from $240 to $391 million; Titan II GLV rockets from $113 to $162 million; Atlas-Agena targets from $88 to $106 million; and supporting development from $29 to $37 million. Estimated operations costs had declined from $59.0 to $47.8 million.
- Archie Moore gave up his world light heavyweight boxing title to move up to the heavyweight division. His successor was Harold Johnson.
- Born: Emilio Estevez, American actor, to then-TV actor Martin Sheen and Janet Templeton Sheen; in Staten Island, New York
- Died: Frank Jenks, 59, American film comedian

== May 13, 1962 (Sunday) ==
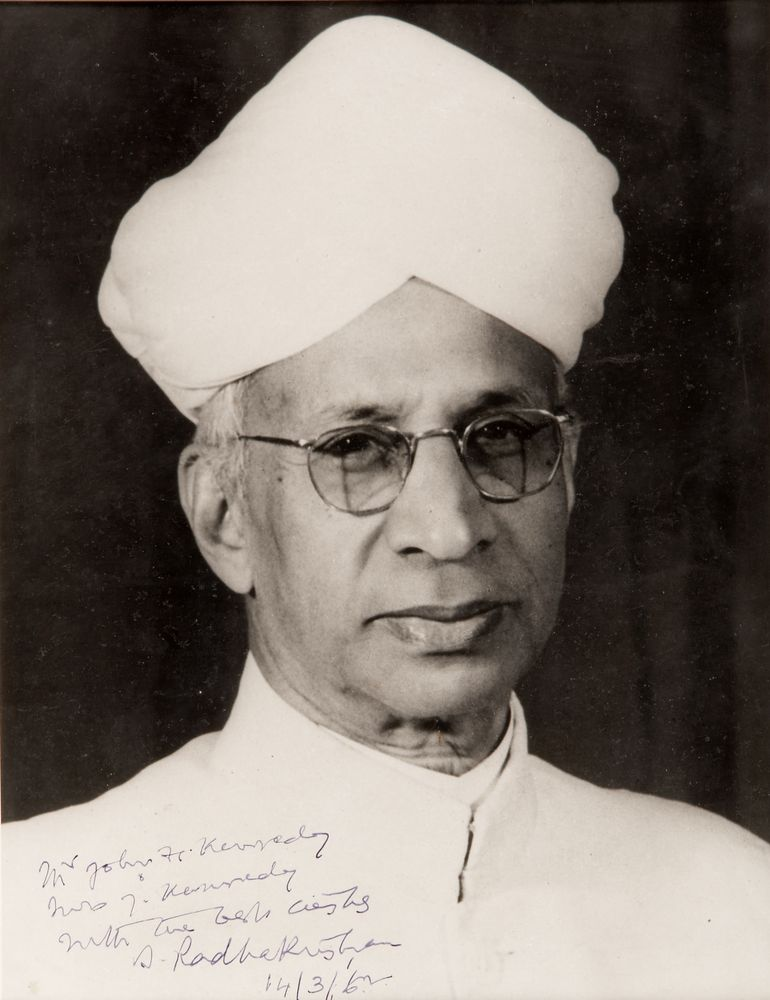
President Radhakrishnan

- Vice-president Sarvepalli Radhakrishnan was sworn in as the second President of India, succeeding Rajendra Prasad. He would serve a full four-year term.
- Born: Paul McDermott, Australian comedian and television presenter; in Adelaide

== May 14, 1962 (Monday) ==
- Prince Juan Carlos of Spain, grandson of Spain's last monarch up that time, King Alfonso XIII, married Princess Sophie of Greece, daughter of King Paul, at a ceremony in Athens. The two would become King and Queen when the monarchy was restored in Spain in 1975.
- Died: Silpa Bhirasri, 69, Thai sculptor and founder of Silpakorn University who had been born in Italy as Corrado Feroci

== May 15, 1962 (Tuesday) ==
- The last execution of an American for armed robbery, without homicide, took place in Huntsville, Texas as an African-American man, 20-year-old Herbert Lemuel Bradley of Dallas, was put to death in the electric chair. Bradley, who had shot an elderly grocer six times in the robbery, told reporters before he died, "I have no complaints. A man has to die sometime, but I don't think this has been fair," noting that he shared the prison with convicts serving terms of 5 to 25 years for armed robbery. The Texas Court of Criminal Appeals had upheld the death sentence on February 28, noting that the victim was still in the hospital more than a year after being shot four times in the stomach during a gunfight.
- Born:
  - Julie Otsuka, American author; in Palo Alto, California
  - Amit Chaudhuri, Indian author; in Calcutta (now Kolkata)
- Died: Michael Dillon, 47, English physician, who, in 1946, became the first person to undergo female-to-male transsexual phalloplasty

== May 16, 1962 (Wednesday) ==
- The first 1,800 United States Marines dispatched to Southeast Asia, troops of the 3rd Marine Expeditionary Brigade, arrived at Bangkok to guard Thailand's border with Laos. The Thai government had given permission for 5,000 American troops to stay.
- Representatives of McDonnell Aircraft and the Gemini Project Office decided to develop more powerful retrograde rocket motors for the Gemini spacecraft, with three times more thrust level to permit retrorocket aborts at altitudes as low as 75,000 feet (23,000 m). Development of the new motors was expected to cost $1,255,000.

== May 17, 1962 (Thursday) ==
- African-American civil rights leader Martin Luther King Jr. delivered a proposed "Second Emancipation Proclamation" to U.S. President Kennedy along with a proposal that Kennedy sign an executive order with the proposed title "On Behalf of the Negro Citizenry of the United States of America in commemoration of the Centennial of the Proclamation of Emancipation". Kennedy declined to act on the request "and noticeably avoided all centennial celebrations" of the original Emancipation Proclamation (which had been signed by U.S. President Abraham Lincoln on September 22, 1862).
- Thalidomide was withdrawn from sale in Japan, bringing an end to the worldwide distribution of the morning sickness drug that had caused birth defects. Dainippon Pharmaceutical halted further shipments. About 1,200 "thalidomide babies" were born in Japan.
- The Mercury 7 mission with Scott Carpenter was postponed a second time because of necessary modifications to the altitude-sensing instrumentation in the parachute-deployment system.
- Born:
  - Craig Ferguson, Scottish-American comedian best known for hosting his late-night talk show The Late Late Show with Craig Ferguson; in Glasgow
  - Arturo Peniche, Mexican telenovela actor; in Mexico City
- Died: E. Franklin Frazier, 67, American sociologist

== May 18, 1962 (Friday) ==
- British soldiers erected a barbed wire barricade along Hong Kong's 12-mile (19 km) border with the People's Republic of China. The purpose was to block refugees from fleeing China into Hong Kong. At the time, as many as 4,000 people were attempting to flee Communist China into the British colony. The next day, British administrators imposed penalties on any Hong Kong resident attempting to assist a refugee's escape.
- McDonnell subcontracted the parachute landing system for Gemini to Northrop Ventura for $1,829,272. The Gemini Project Office had decided in April on using a system of one 84.2-foot (25.7 m) diameter ring-sail parachute, but now decided to add an 18-foot (5.5 m) ring-sail drogue parachute to the system. McDonnell proposed deploying the drogue at 10,000 feet (3,000 m). NASA would concur on May 24.
- The Panchen Lama, leader of the Tibetan people since the nation's conquest by Communist China, presented a 70,000-word petition to visiting Chinese Premier Zhou Enlai, pleading for relief for the suffering of Tibetans under Communist rule. Repression of Tibetan Buddhists eased to some extent after the Panchen Lama's bold move.
- Al Oerter became the first person to throw the discus more than 200 feet (61 m), setting a mark of 61.10 m (200 ft 6 in) at Los Angeles.
- Born:
  - Sandra (stage name for Sandra Ann Lauer), German pop singer who achieved international fame in the 1980s and 1990s; in Saarbrücken, West Germany
  - Karel Roden, Czech actor; in České Budějovice

== May 19, 1962 (Saturday) ==
- Marilyn Monroe made her last significant public appearance, singing "Happy Birthday, Mr. President" at a birthday party for President John F. Kennedy at Madison Square Garden. The event was part of a fundraiser to pay off the Democratic Party's four million-dollar debt remaining from Kennedy's 1960 presidential campaign. Monroe was stitched into a $12,000 dress "made of nothing but beads" and wore nothing underneath as she appeared at the request of Peter Lawford; President Kennedy thanked her afterward, joking, "I can now retire from politics after having had 'Happy Birthday' sung to me in such a sweet, wholesome way."
- Mercury 7 was postponed a third time because of irregularities in the temperature control device on a heater in the Atlas flight control system.
- Died: Gabriele Münter, 85, German expressionist painter

== May 20, 1962 (Sunday) ==
- The Conseil national de la Résistance, a terrorist organization with a goal of assassinating France's president Charles de Gaulle, was founded in Rome by former French Army Lieutenant Colonel Antoine Argoud, who had escaped arrest for his membership in the rebel Organisation armée secrète that sought to stop France from granting independence to Algeria.
- The first specifically built coronary care unit in the world opened at the Bethany Hospital in Kansas City, Missouri, under the planning of cardiologist Dr. Hughes Day. Other CCUs followed in Toronto, Sydney, New York and Philadelphia, and by 1970, most major hospitals had units designed to treat heart attacks.
- The 1962 Dutch Grand Prix at Circuit Park Zandvoort opened the Formula One Championship season. It was won by Graham Hill. The non-championship 1962 Naples Grand Prix took place on the same day at the Posillipo Circuit, and was won by Willy Mairesse.
- Born:
  - Aleksandr Dedyushko, Belarusian television actor; in Volkovysk, Byelorussian SSR, Soviet Union (now Vawkavysk, Belarus) (died in car accident, 2007)
  - Christiane F. (Vera Christiane Felscherinow), German heroin addict who is the subject of the book Zoo Station: The Story of Christiane F.; in Hamburg

== May 21, 1962 (Monday) ==
- Egypt's President Gamel Abdel Nasser unveiled his "National Charter of the Arab Socialist Union", proclaiming that the "Arab Revolution" would win its "battle of destiny" by "enlightened thought", "free movement" and "clear perception" of the revolution's objectives.
- Soviet leader Nikita Khrushchev accepted the recommendation from his Defense Council to place nuclear missiles in Cuba, an act which would lead to the Cuban Missile Crisis and the threat of a nuclear war between the U.S. and the USSR in October.
- McDonnell awarded an $8 million subcontract to Electro-Mechanical Research, Inc. for the data transmission system for the Gemini spacecraft. Another contract assigned $2,609,000 to convert pad 19 at Cape Canaveral for Gemini flights. Construction began in September 1962 and would be completed by October 17, 1963.
- In Baltimore, federal district judge Roszel C. Thomsen dismissed the antitrust lawsuit by the American Football League against the National Football League. The suit arose from the NFL's action of placing franchises in Dallas and Minneapolis after the AFL had been founded with teams there.
- Born:
  - Tina Landau, American playwright and theatre director; in New York City
  - Hege Storhaug, Norwegian journalist and activist; in Arendal

== May 22, 1962 (Tuesday) ==
- All 45 people on board Continental Airlines Flight 11 were killed when the Boeing 707 was destroyed by dynamite while at an altitude of 39,000 feet (12,000 m). The airliner was flying from Chicago to Kansas City when the explosion occurred in the rear lavatory while the jet was over Centerville, Iowa near the border between the U.S. states of Iowa and Missouri. The fuselage came down 19 miles (31 km) from Centerville on a farm near Unionville, Missouri. Contact was lost at 9:15 p.m. and the plane had disappeared from radar at 9:40 after leaving behind a 60-mile (97 km) line of debris, including a briefcase with the initials "T.G.D."; Thomas G. Doty, one of the passengers, had been on his way to Kansas City to face criminal charges for armed robbery. He had taken out a $300,000 life insurance policy payable to his wife and had bought sticks of dynamite at a hardware store before carrying out the murder-suicide.
- Victoria Bell of Little Rock, Arkansas and her 11 children arrived in Hyannis, Massachusetts, as part of a pernicious initiative orchestrated by Orval Faubus, Governor of Arkansas, to send the family to a northern state. This move was viewed by many as an attempt by Faubus to challenge the Northern states' stance on racial integration. The family's relocation garnered nationwide media attention and heightened tensions surrounding the civil rights movement. John A. Volpe, Governor of Massachusetts, denounced the move as "Trafficking in misery", affirming the state's commitment to supporting the Bells and two other families. This event was part of a broader initiative called the "Reverse Freedom Rides," which aimed to disrupt northern civil rights efforts.
- American composer Richard Rodgers became the first "EGOT" (the winner of a Emmy, Grammy, Oscar, and Tony for television, recorded music, film and stage, respectively) when he received the Emmy Award for Outstanding Original Music for Television, as composer of music for the ABC television show Winston Churchill: The Valiant Years. He had won an Oscar in 1945 for Best Original Song ("It Might as Well Be Spring"), his first Tony Award in 1950 (South Pacific), and his first Grammy Award in 1961 (The Sound of Music).
- Born:
  - Brian Pillman, American football player and professional Wrestler who worked for WCW and the WWF (now WWE); in Cincinnati (died from heart disease, 1997)
  - John Sarbanes, American politician and U.S. Representative for Maryland's 3rd district since 2007, son of longtime Congressman and Senator Paul Sarbanes; in Baltimore

== May 23, 1962 (Wednesday) ==
- The first successful reattachment (replantation) of a severed limb was accomplished by Dr. Ronald A. Malt at Massachusetts General Hospital in Boston. Everett Knowles, a 12-year-old boy, had had his right arm severed at the shoulder by a freight train. A year after the limb was saved, Everett could move all five fingers and bend his wrist, and by 1965, he was again playing baseball and tennis.
- Former French Army General Raoul Salan, founder of the French terrorist Organisation armée secrète, was sentenced to life imprisonment for treason, after initially being given a death sentence in absentia. General Salan would be pardoned by President Charles de Gaulle on June 15, 1968, after more than six years' incarceration at the prison in Tulle.
- U.S. President Kennedy signed a Presidential Directive waiving the quota against accepting immigrants from China. Since 1943, the quota for Chinese immigrants had been only 105 per year. Within three years, President Lyndon Johnson would put the quota for Asian nations at the same level as that for European nations.
- Drilling for the first subway in Montreal commenced at 8:00 a.m., as a crew began to bore a 1.2-mile (1.9 km) long tunnel under Berri Street, to run between Metropolitan Boulevard and Jean Talon Street.
- Avco Manufacturing Corporation presented a proposal to MSC on a proposal for an orbiting space station, with a primary purpose of determining the effects of zero-g on the crew's ability to stand reentry. Avco proposed a station with three separate tubes about 3 metres (9.8 ft) in diameter and 6 metres (20 ft) long, to be launched separately and then joined into a triangular shape in orbit.
- Ernst Krenek's opera What Price Confidence? premièred at Saarbrücken, seventeen years after its composition.
- Ames Research Center began the first wind tunnel test of the Paraglider Development Program.
- Died: Rubén Jaramillo, 61, Mexican activist for land reform, along with his wife and three of his four children, after being arrested by Mexican soldiers at his home in Xochicalco.

== May 24, 1962 (Thursday) ==
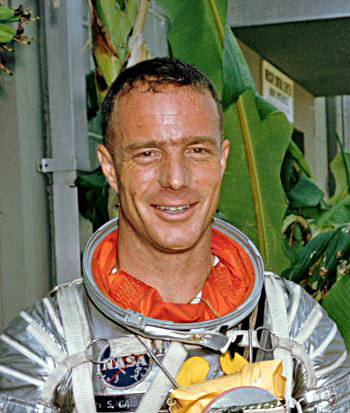
Carpenter

- Scott Carpenter orbited the Earth three times in the Aurora 7 space capsule, then splashed down 250 miles (400 km) off course in the Atlantic Ocean. He was located and rescued by the aircraft carrier USS Intrepid (CV-11). The Mercury 7 mission lifted off from Cape Canaveral at 7:45 a.m. (1245 UTC) local time, went around the Earth three times, then began its return at 1:30 p.m. (1830 UTC). Instead of being tilted 34° toward the horizon, the capsule was inclined at 25° and overshot its mark, landing at 1:41 p.m. The mission achieved all objectives. Only one critical component malfunction occurred, a random failure of the pitch horizon scanner, which provided a reference point to the attitude gyroscopes. To compensate, the spacecraft was allowed to drift for 77 additional minutes and the flight lasted 4 hours and 56 minutes. Splashdown happened 125 miles (201 km) northeast of Puerto Rico. The overshoot was traced to a 25° yaw error when the retrograde rockets were fired, about three seconds late, which caused 20 miles (32 km) of the overshoot. Carpenter, who had deployed a rubber raft, floated for 2 hours and 59 minutes before being rescued by helicopter.
- The string quartet piece ST/10=1, 080262, the first classical music composed using a computer, was premiered. Greek composer Iannis Xenakis had created the work with the aid of an IBM 7090 computer.
- The U.S. Embassy in Moscow renewed the passport of Lee Harvey Oswald and approved the entry of his wife and daughter into the United States.
- North American Aviation began testing the emergency parachute system for the Gemini flight test vehicle.

== May 25, 1962 (Friday) ==
- The new Coventry Cathedral, also known as St Michael's Cathedral, was consecrated in Coventry, West Midlands, for the Church of England, more than 20 years after the November 14, 1940 destruction of the 500-year-old Cathedral by German Luftwaffe bombers during World War II. The new cathedral, symbolic of forgiveness and rebirth, stands next to the ruins of the old one.
- A group of students at Haigazian University in Beirut launched the first rocket in what would become the Lebanese space program, sending the HCRS-7 Cedar rocket to an altitude of 11,500 metres (37,700 ft) under the supervision and protection of the Lebanese Army, which arranged for the clearing of airspace around the launch area.
- Died:
  - David Ogle, 40, English automobile designer who had founded his own sports car company, was killed while driving his Ogle Mini GT sports to a race circuit where he was going to demonstrate the vehicle. He was on the A1 highway at Digswell, Hertfordshire and traveling at 85 miles per hour (137 km/h) when he collided with a van and the car burst into flame.
  - Simone Tanner Chaumet, 45, French humanitarian honored for her role in saving hundreds of Jewish children in France during World War II, and later a peace activist in Algeria, was murdered in the Algiers suburb of Bouzaréah.

== May 26, 1962 (Saturday) ==
- Acker Bilk's "Stranger On The Shore" became the first British recording to reach number one in the U.S. Billboard Hot 100, setting a background for the "British Invasion" that would follow with The Tornados later in the year, and with The Beatles, Peter and Gordon, The Animals and Manfred Mann with nine #1 hits between them in 1964.
- Born:
  - Anthony Joyner, American serial killer and rapist convicted for at least six homicides (and suspected in 12 others) of elderly women at a nursing home where he was employed; in Philadelphia
  - Bobcat Goldthwait (stage name for Robert Francis Goldwait), American comedian on film and TV; in Syracuse, New York

== May 27, 1962 (Sunday) ==
- Pursuant to the township council resolution of May 7, the contents of the new landfill in Centralia, Pennsylvania, a town with 1,435 residents, were burned as part of a cleanup on the day before Memorial Day. As had been done in the past, the volunteer fire department then extinguished the blaze. The new landfill, however, had been placed above an abandoned coal mine and the fire continued to burn underground, ultimately reducing Centralia to a ghost town.
- Born:
  - Scott Perry, American politician and retired U.S. Army National Guard brigadier general who is the U.S. representative for Pennsylvania's 10th congressional district; in San Diego
  - Ravi Shastri, Indian cricketer who was captain of the Indian national team in the 1980s and later the team's coach; in Bombay (now Mumbai)
- Died: Egon Petri, 81, Dutch pianist

== May 28, 1962 (Monday) ==
- The Soviet Union launched the Kosmos 5 scientific research and technology demonstration satellite, becoming the last satellite in the Kosmos programme to reach orbit successfully.
- The Manned Spacecraft Center shipped Mercury mission survival kits to the U.S. Navy and to the U.S. Air Force for its X-20 Dyna Soar development program.
- Born: Brandon Cruz, American TV actor and punk rock musician who co-starred as a child with Bill Bixby in The Courtship of Eddie's Father, and was lead vocalist as an adult for Dead Kennedys; in Bakersfield, California
- Died: Assar Gabrielsson, 70, Swedish industrialist and co-founder of the Volvo automobile company

== May 29, 1962 (Tuesday) ==
- Negotiations began between the European French Algerian paramilitary rebels of the OAS (Organisation armée secrète), and the Arab Algerian independence fighters of the (FLN) Front de libération nationale with a goal toward reaching a ceasefire between the two armies in the Algerian War. Fighting would finally cease on June 17, 1962, and Algeria would become an independent nation, ruled by its Arab Algerian majority population, on July 5.
- In a runoff in the primary election for the Democratic Party nominee for Governor of Alabama, segregationist and circuit judge George C. Wallace defeated state senator Ryan DeGraffenried, Sr.
- Stock prices fell worldwide in the largest one-day decline since the Great Depression. Heavy sales were registered in New York, London, Tokyo, Paris, Frankfurt and Zurich.
- Four window cleaners were killed when a scaffold fell from the 19th floor of the Equitable Building in Manhattan.
- Representatives of McDonnell, Weber Aircraft, the Gemini Project Office, and the U.S. Navy's China Lake Naval Ordnance Test Station concluded plans for development testing of the Gemini spacecraft ejection seat.

== May 30, 1962 (Wednesday) ==
- The 1962 FIFA World Cup began in Chile with 16 nations qualifying for the competition to reach the final, with four groups of four teams each. On the first day, with games all starting at 3:00 in the afternoon, Uruguay beat Colombia 2—1 (Group 1) at Arica; Chile beat Switzerland 3—1 (Group 2) at Santiago; Brazil beat Mexico 2—0 (Group 3) at Viña del Mar; and Argentina beat Bulgaria 1—0 (Group 4) at Rancagua.
- In the deadliest road accident in India up to that time, 70 people were killed when an overloaded Gujarat State Road Transport Corporation bus crashed through a bridge railing near Kapadvanj and sank in the Mahi River. Only 18 people survived.
- On the same day, in the Philippines, 30 people were killed and 10 injured when a bus, carrying students on a holiday outing, fell off of a wooden bridge and was swept away by the Alalum Falls near the town of Sumilao in the Bukidnon province on southern Mindanao.
- Benjamin Britten's War Requiem was performed for the first time, in the arts festival held to celebrate the reconsecration of Coventry Cathedral.
- Born:
  - Kevin Eastman, American comic book artist, and writer best known for co-creating the Teenage Mutant Ninja Turtles; in Portland, Maine
  - Timo Soini, 31st Deputy Prime Minister of Finland from 2015 to 2017 and Foreign Affairs Minister from 2015 to 2019; in Rauma
- Died: Pierre Gilliard, 85, Swiss academic, former tutor to the Russian royal family

== May 31, 1962 (Thursday) ==
- The hanging of Adolf Eichmann, 56, German Nazi and SS-Obersturmbannführer (Lieutenant Colonel) and one of the major organizers of the Holocaust, was carried out at 11:58 p.m. local time "on an improvised scaffold in a third story storeroom" at the Ayalon Prison in Ramla, near Tel Aviv. Eichmann, who had been captured by agents of Israel's Mossad spy agency on March 21, 1960, and then taken from Argentina to Israel for his role in the extermination of 6,000,000 European Jews, would become the first person to be legally executed in the history of modern Israel. The body was cremated soon afterward and Eichmann's ashes scattered over the Mediterranean Sea.
- The Northern Ireland general election produced a large majority for the Ulster Unionist Party, which won 34 out of 51 seats. The Nationalist Party gained 2 seats to give it a total of nine.
- A speeding freight train killed 62 people who were at the back of a passenger train near Voghera in Italy. Most of the dead were vacationers on their way to the French Riviera.
- Born:
  - Dina Boluarte, Peruvian politician, civil servant, and lawyer currently serving as the 64th President of Peru since 2022; in Chalhuanca
  - Sebastian Koch, German film actor (The Lives of Others, Bridge of Spies); in Karlsruhe, West Germany
  - Yōko Sōmi, Japanese voice actress; in Niigata Prefecture
