= July 1962 =

Month of 1962

<<	July 1962					>>
Su	Mo	Tu	We	Th	Fr	Sa
1	2	3	4	5	6	7
8	9	10	11	12	13	14
15	16	17	18	19	20	21
22	23	24	25	26	27	28
29	30	31

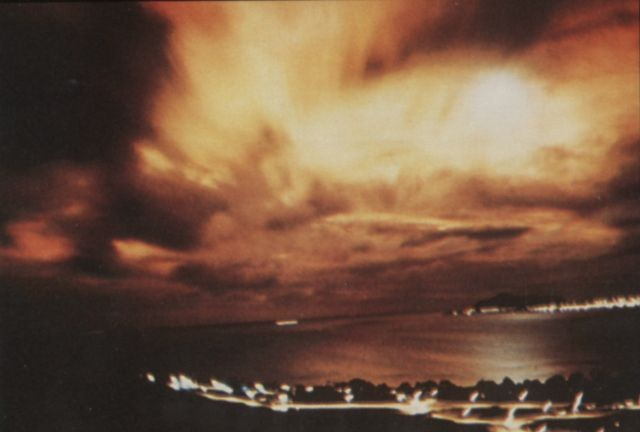
July 9, 1962: Hawaii receives EMP from distant nuclear test

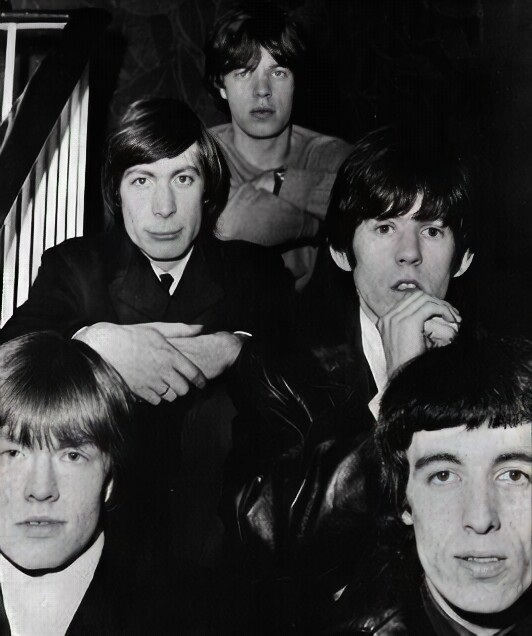
July 12, 1962: The Rolling Stones debut

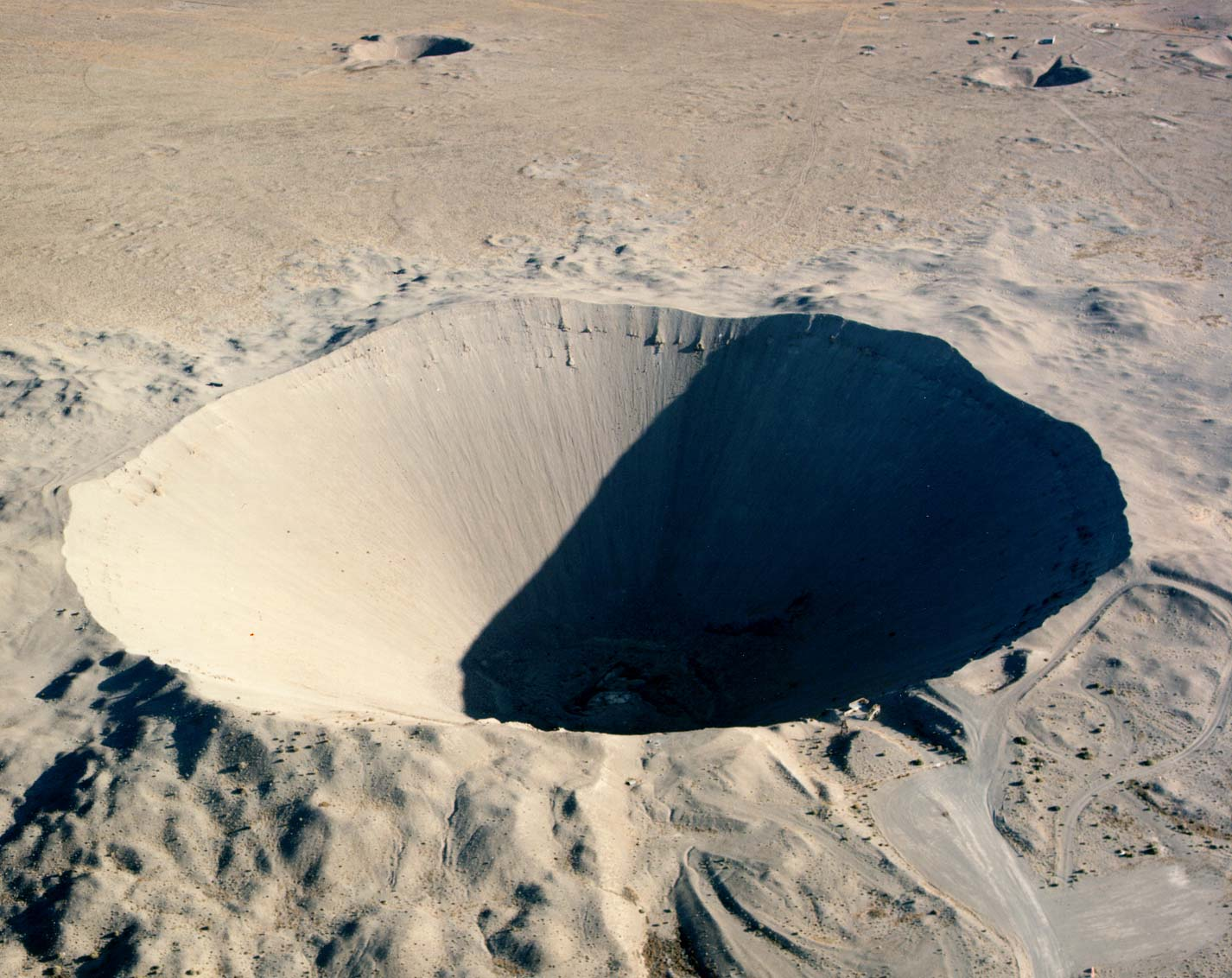
July 6, 1962: Nevada's Sedan Crater, 1200 feet wide, 320 feet deep, is created instantly by a nuclear bomb

July 2, 1962: First Walmart store opens

The following events occurred in July 1962:

== July 1, 1962 (Sunday) ==
Rwanda

Burundi

- Rwanda and Burundi, the northern and southern portions of Ruanda-Urundi, were both granted independence from Belgium on the same day. Grégoire Kayibanda of the Hutu tribe was sworn in as President of Rwanda at Kigali, and Mwambutsa IV, who had reigned as the titular leader of the Tutsi tribe since 1915, continued as King of Burundi.
- In Merritt Island, Florida, NASA formed the Launch Operations Center, now known as the Kennedy Space Center. Since December 1968, KSC has been NASA's primary launch center of human spaceflight including the launch operations for the Apollo, Skylab, and Space Shuttle programs.
- The first Canadian Medicare plan was launched in Saskatchewan, resulting in the Saskatchewan doctors' strike. Thousands of citizens joined the protests against compulsory health care ten days later.
- Bruce McLaren won the 1962 Reims Grand Prix. McClaren of New Zealand, a former rugby player turned race car driver, finished the 250-mile (400 km) course in 2 hours, 2 seconds.
- Julio Adalberto Rivera Carballo became President of El Salvador. He had been the only candidate in elections on April 30.
- Relocation of the Manned Spacecraft Center (now the Johnson Space Center) from Langley Field to Houston, Texas, was completed.
- The Treaty of Nordic Cooperation of Helsinki, signed on March 23, 1962, came into force.
- Supporters of Algerian independence won a 90% majority in a referendum.
- Born: Andre Braugher, American actor best known for his roles as Detective Frank Pembleton in Homicide: Life on the Street and Captain Raymond Holt in Brooklyn Nine-Nine; in Chicago, Illinois (d. 2023)
- Died: Bidhan Chandra Roy, 80, Indian politician and Chief Minister of West Bengal since 1948

== July 2, 1962 (Monday) ==
- Sam Walton opened the first Walmart store as Wal-Mart Discount City in Rogers, Arkansas, United States. By 1970, there would be 38 Walmart stores. After 50 years, there were more than 9,766 stores in 27 countries, and 11,766 by mid-2019.
- Off-the-pad Gemini ejection tests began at Naval Ordnance Test Station and were completed by the first week of August. The tests showed problems which led to two important design changes, adding a drogue-gun method of deploying the parachute and installing a three-point harness-release system similar to those used in military aircraft.

== July 3, 1962 (Tuesday) ==
- France and its President, Charles de Gaulle, recognized the independence of Algeria, with the signing of the declaration at a meeting of the French Cabinet.
- The Chichester Festival Theatre, Britain's first large modern theatre with a thrust stage, opened. Laurence Olivier was the first artistic director.
- The 1962 World Artistic Gymnastics Championships opened in Prague and ran until July 8.
- Born:
  - Tom Cruise, American film actor known for Risky Business, Jerry Maguire and the Mission: Impossible film series; as Thomas Cruise Mapother IV in Syracuse, New York
  - Thomas Gibson, American TV actor known for Criminal Minds and Dharma and Greg;in Charleston, South Carolina

== July 4, 1962 (Wednesday) ==
- The Burma Socialist Programme Party was established by Ne Win's military regime.

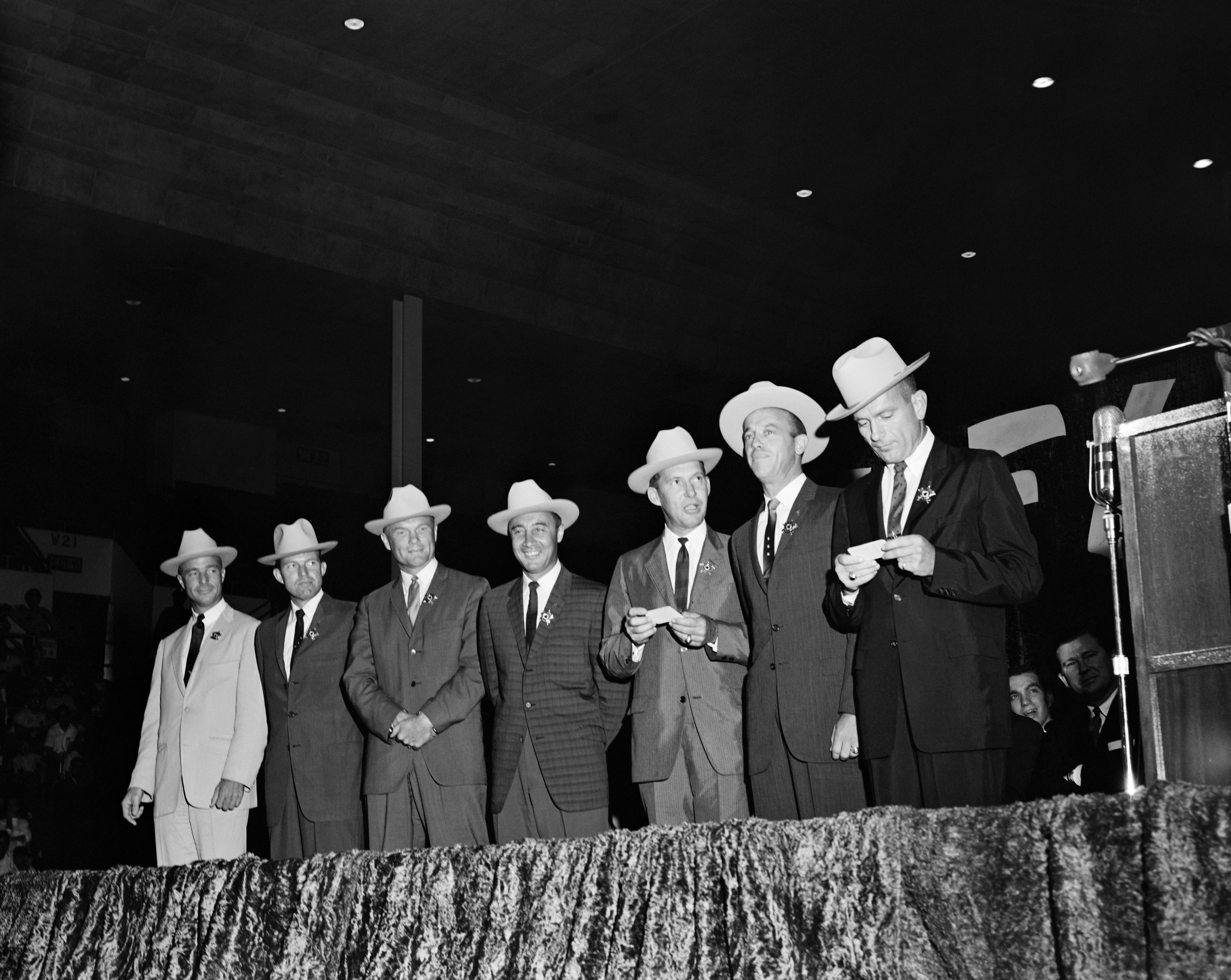
July 4, 1962: The Mercury astronauts at the Houston Coliseum barbecue

- Houston welcomed the Mercury astronauts with its Fourth of July parade, followed by a barbecue at the Sam Houston Coliseum featuring a performance by burlesque dancer Sally Rand. This event would form the basis of a major set piece in Tom Wolfe's 1979 book The Right Stuff.
- Born:
  - Pam Shriver, American tennis player, winner of multiple women's doubles championships with Martina Navratilova; in Baltimore
  - Neil Morrissey, English comedian and actor; in Stafford, Staffordshire

== July 5, 1962 (Thursday) ==
- The French Assembly voted, 241 to 72 to end the immunity of former Prime Minister Georges Bidault against arrest and prosecution, which he had held in April 1961, when he had called for the overthrow of President Charles De Gaulle. The vote cleared the way for a treason indictment of Bidault, who had fled to Italy.
- After Algeria's independence was recognized by France, 20 French Algerians and 75 Algerians were killed in a massacre which took place at Oran, the section of Algiers where most French Algerians lived.

== July 6, 1962 (Friday) ==
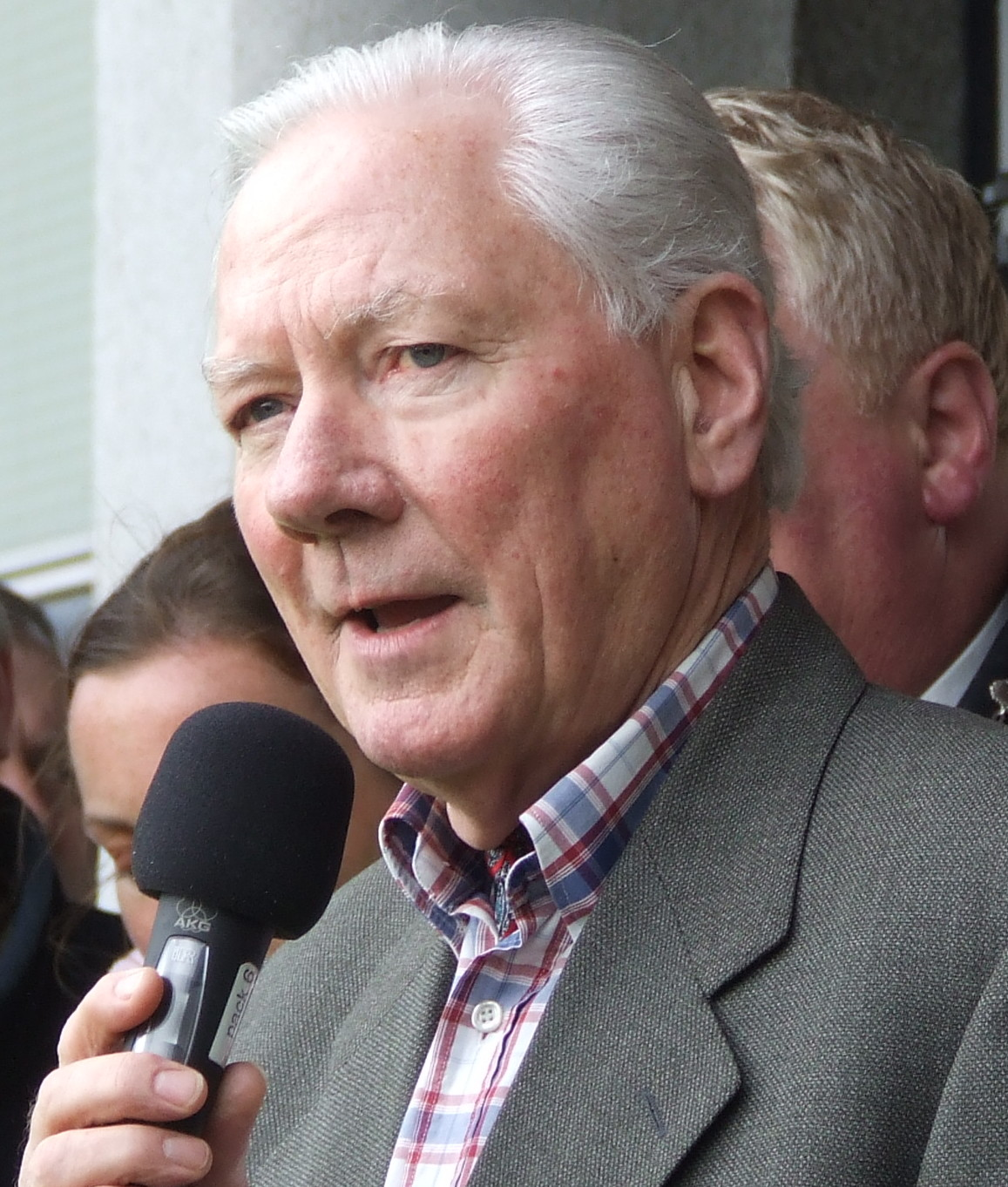
Byrne

- Irish broadcaster Gay Byrne presented his first edition of The Late Late Show. Byrne would go on to present the talk show for 37 years, making him the longest-running TV talk show host in history.

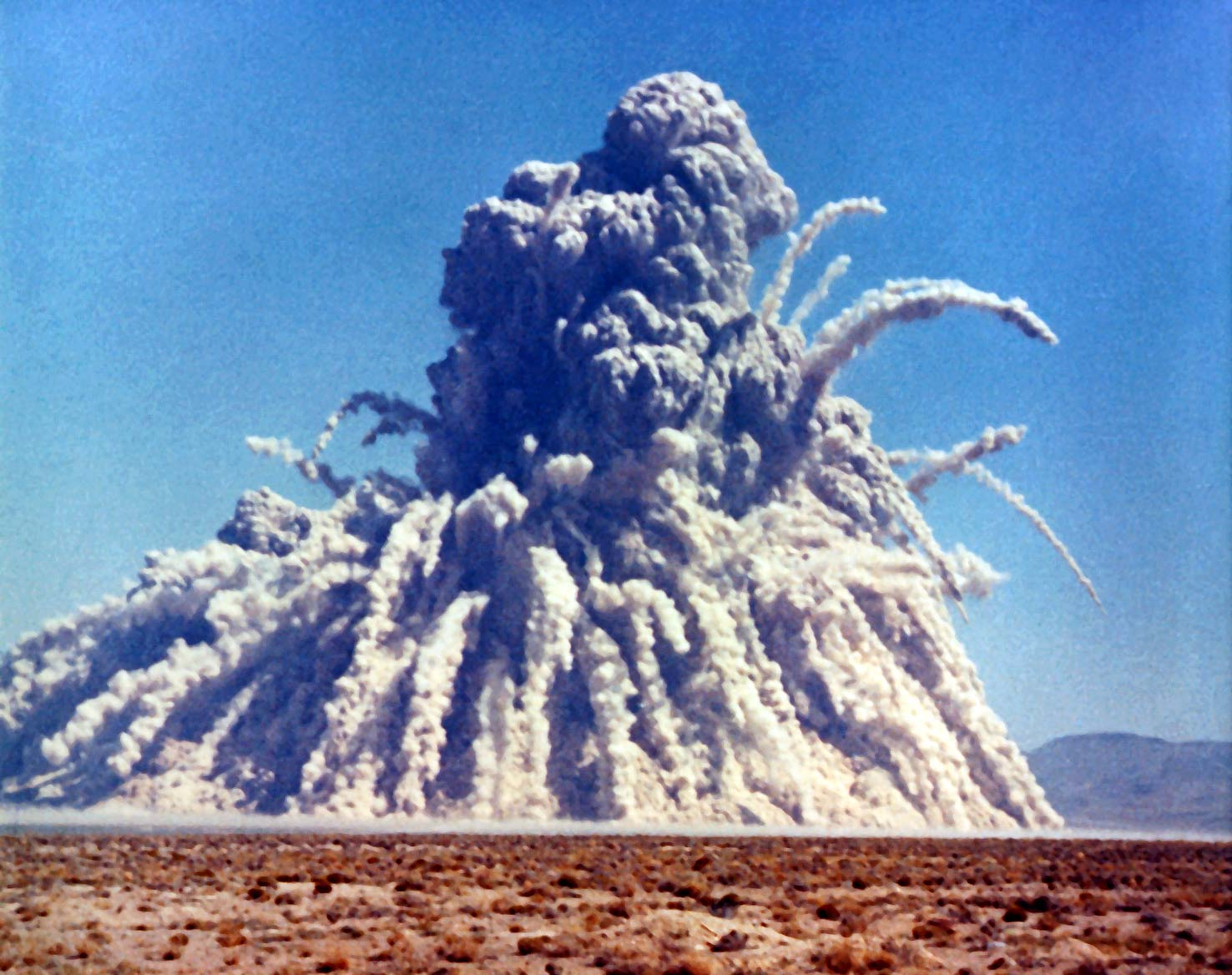
"Digging" the Sedan Crater in Nevada

- The 320-foot (98 m) deep Sedan Crater, measuring 1,280 feet (390 m) in diameter, was created in a split second in Nye County, Nevada, with an American underground nuclear test. The fallout exposed 13 million Americans to radiation; regular monthly tours are now given of the crater, which ceased being radioactive after less than a year.
- Martin Marietta presented its "piggyback plan" for flight testing the malfunction detection system (MDS) for the Gemini launch vehicle. The plan required installing the detection system in engines on six Titan II flights to demonstrate its reliability.
- Died:
  - Archduke Joseph August of Austria, 89, a Feldmarschall (field marshal) of the Austro-Hungarian Army and for a short period head of state of Hungary
  - Roger Degueldre, 37, former French Army officer who rebelled to form the OAS Delta Commandos, was executed by a firing squad
  - William Faulkner, 64, American novelist and 1950 Nobel laureate

== July 7, 1962 (Saturday) ==
- All 94 people aboard Alitalia Flight 771 were killed when the airliner crashed into a hill about 84 kilometres (52 mi) north-east of Mumbai.
- In Burma, the government of General Ne Win forcibly broke up a demonstration at Rangoon University, killing 15 students and wounding 27.
- A Soviet Air Force pilot flying a Mikoyan-Gurevich Ye-152 set a new airspeed record of 1,666 miles per hour (2,681 km/h).

== July 8, 1962 (Sunday) ==
- In the most important symbolic gesture of post-war French-German unity, President Charles de Gaulle of France and Chancellor Konrad Adenauer of West Germany, both devout Catholics, attended mass at the Reims Cathedral and prayed together. The Cathedral was where the Emperor common to both nations, Carolus Magnus (Charlemagne in France and Karl der Große in Germany)— had been baptized at Reims.
- The 1962 French Grand Prix was held at Rouen-Les-Essarts and won by Dan Gurney of the United States.
- Born: Joan Osborne, American singer-songwriter; in Anchorage, Kentucky

== July 9, 1962 (Monday) ==
- In the Starfish Prime test, the United States exploded a 1.4 megaton hydrogen bomb in outer space, sending the warhead on a Titan missile to an altitude of 248 miles (399 km) over Johnston Island. The first two attempts at exploding a nuclear missile above the Earth had failed. The flash was visible in Hawaii, 750 miles (1,210 km) away, and scientists discovered the destructive effects of the first major manmade electromagnetic pulse (EMP), as a surge of electrons burned out streetlights, blew fuses, and disrupted communications. Increasing radiation in some places one hundredfold, the EMP damaged at least ten orbiting satellites beyond repair.
- NASA scientists concluded that the layer of haze reported by astronauts John Glenn and Scott Carpenter was a phenomenon called "airglow". Using a photometer on his mission in May, Carpenter was able to measure the layer. Airglow accounts for much of the illumination in the night sky.
- American artist Andy Warhol first presented his Campbell's Soup Cans at the Ferus Gallery in Los Angeles.
- Died: Georges Bataille, 64, French philosopher and writer; of arteriosclerosis

== July 10, 1962 (Tuesday) ==
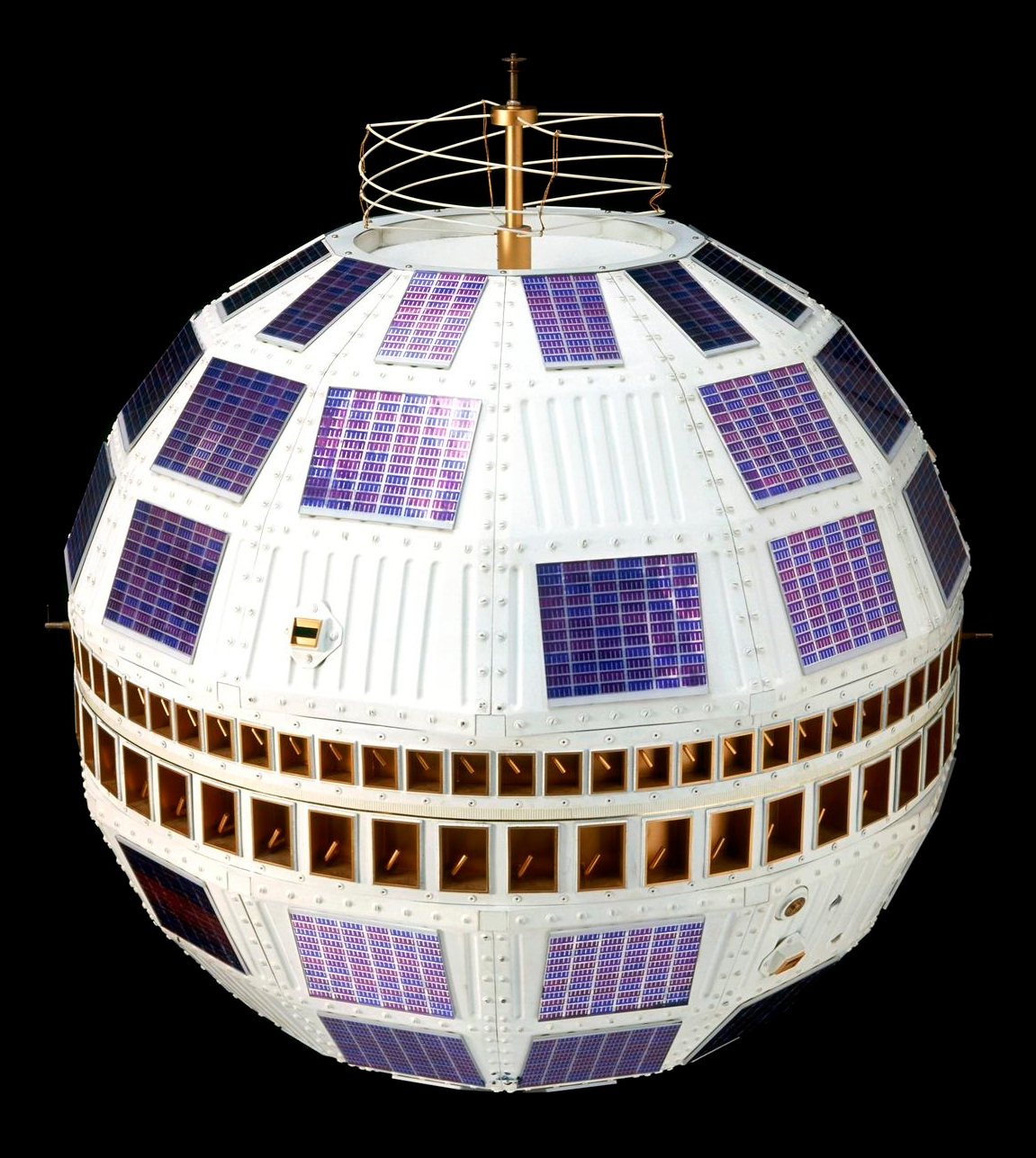
Telstar

- AT&T's Telstar, the world's first commercial communications satellite, was launched into orbit from Cape Canaveral at 3:35 a.m. local time, and activated that night. The first image transmitted between continents was a black-and-white photo of the American flag sent from the U.S. transmitter at Andover, Maine, to Pleumeur-Bodou in France.
- The All-Channel Television Receiver Bill was signed into law, requiring that all televisions made in the United States to be able to receive both VHF signals (channels 2 to 13 on 30 to 300 MHz) and UHF (channels 14 to 83, on frequencies between 470 and 896 MHz). The change encouraged the opening of hundreds of new U.S. television stations.
- One of the spans in the Kings Bridge in Melbourne, Australia, collapsed after a 45-tonne (44-long-ton; 50-short-ton) vehicle passed over it, only 15 months after the multi-lane highway bridge's opening on April 12, 1961. The collapse occurred immediately after the driver of the vehicle had passed over the span, and nobody was hurt.
- Francisco Brochado de Rocha was approved as the new Prime Minister of Brazil by a 215–58 vote of Parliament.
- Born: Christopher Martin, formerly known as Play, comedian, actor and rapper of the hip-hop duo Kid 'n Play; in Queens
- Died: Tommy Milton, 68, American race car driver and first to win the Indianapolis 500 twice (in 1921 and 1923 despite being blind in one eye), shot himself twice after making his own funeral arrangements.

== July 11, 1962 (Wednesday) ==
- NASA officials decided to proceed with Project Apollo, the crewed lunar exploration program, to using lunar orbit rendezvous (LOR) as the prime mission mode, rather than direct ascent or earth orbit rendezvous. The decision enabled immediate planning for the next phase of American space exploration to proceed.
- The first person to swim across the English Channel underwater, without surfacing, arrived in Sandwich Bay, Kent, England, 18 hours after departing from Calais, France. Fred Baldasare wore scuba gear and was assisted by a guiding ship and the use of oxygen tanks.
- Born: Pauline McLynn, Irish comedian and TV actress; in Sligo, County Sligo
- Died: Owen D. Young, 87, American businessman who founded Radio Corporation of America (RCA) and co-founded the National Broadcasting Company (NBC)

== July 12, 1962 (Thursday) ==
- The Rolling Stones made their debut at London's Marquee Club, Number 165 Oxford Street, opening for the first time under that name, for Long John Baldry. Mick Jagger, Brian Jones, Keith Richards, Ian Stewart, Dick Taylor and Tony Chapman had played together for the group Blues Incorporated before creating a new name inspired by the Muddy Waters 1950 single "Rollin' Stone". The day before the concert, an ad in the July 11, 1962, edition of Jazz News, a London weekly jazz paper, had shown the drummer to be Mick Avory, who later played for The Kinks, rather than Chapman. Avory himself, however, would say in an interview that he did not play in the event.
- The first telephone signals carried by satellite were made by engineers between Goonhilly in the UK and Andover, Maine, in the U.S.
- Representatives of Gemini Project Office (GPO) presented a list of minimum basic maneuvers of the Agena targeting and docking at a conference with the U.S. Air Force Space System Division, Marshall Space Flight Center, and Lockheed on coordination of the Atlas-Agena program for a linkup of vehicles in orbit above the Earth. The parties agreed to begin work immediately after the last Project Mercury flight.
- Born: Julio César Chávez, Mexican boxer, WBC champion at three levels (super featherweight, lightweight, light welterweight and welterweight) between 1984 and 1996; in Ciudad Obregón
- Died: James T. Blair, Jr., 60, former Governor of Missouri (1957–1961); along with his wife, from accidental carbon monoxide poisoning at his home, near Jefferson City, Missouri

== July 13, 1962 (Friday) ==
- With his popularity declining, British Prime Minister Harold Macmillan fired seven senior members of his cabinet, including Chancellor of the Exchequer Selwyn Lloyd, the Lord Chancellor, the Ministers of Defence and Education, and the Secretary of State for Scotland. The move was unprecedented in United Kingdom history, and was followed by the firing of nine junior ministers the following Monday. Liberal MP Jeremy Thorpe would quip, "Greater love hath no man than this, that he lay down his friends for his life." The British press would dub the event Macmillan's "Night of the Long Knives".
- International telephone calls, via satellite, were inaugurated by AT&T, as company president Eugene McNeely placed a call to the French Minister of Posts, Telegraphs, and Telephones, Jacques Marette. On Telstar's next orbit, McNeely spoke with Sir Ronald German, the British General Post Office Director-General.
- Tests of the Mercury pressure suit were conducted with a human subject, who wore a modified B-70 (Valkyrie) harness, which appeared to have advantages over the existing Mercury harness.
- U Thant, Secretary-General of the United Nations, arrived in Dublin, and paid tribute to Irish soldiers who fought in the Congo.
- Burmese leader Ne Win left the country for a trip to Austria, Switzerland and the United Kingdom, "for a medical check up".
- Born: Tom Kenny, American voice actor best known as the voice of SpongeBob in over 300 episodes of the long-running cartoon SpongeBob SquarePants; in Syracuse, New York

== July 14, 1962 (Saturday) ==
- A 1958 Pakistan law, banning all political parties, was repealed by a National Assembly resolution, amending the Constitution of 1962. The only requirement was that a party could not prejudice Islamic ideology or the stability or integrity of Pakistan, and could not receive any aid from a foreign nation.
- In the third match of the rugby league Test series between Australia and Great Britain, held at Sydney Cricket Ground, a controversial last-minute Australian try and the subsequent conversion resulted in an 18–17 win for Australia.
- The Miss Universe 1962 beauty pageant took place at Miami Beach, Florida, and was won by Norma Nolan of Argentina.
- Henry Brooke became the new UK Home Secretary in Harold Macmillan's reshuffled cabinet.

== July 15, 1962 (Sunday) ==
- The Washington Post broke the story of thalidomide tablets that had been distributed in the United States, in a story by Morton Mintz under the headline "Heroine of FDA Keeps Bad Drug Off Market". As a result of the publicity, more than 2.5 million thalidomide pills, which had been distributed to physicians by the Richardson-Merrell pharmaceutical company pending approval by the U.S. Food and Drug Administration, were recalled. Although thousands of babies were born with defects in Europe, the FDA identified only 17 known cases in the United States.
- Six animals (two monkeys and four hamsters) died from radiation poisoning, after having been sent into space by NASA a day earlier in the first test of whether astronauts could safely endure prolonged exposure to cosmic rays. The animals had been inside a space capsule that had been kept at an altitude of 131,000 feet (40,000 m) by a balloon.
- Jacques Anquetil won the Tour de France for the third time.
- Born: Glen Edward Rogers, American serial killer who was suspected of stabbing and strangling an elderly man and four women in five separate states between 1993 and 1995; in Hamilton, Ohio

== July 16, 1962 (Monday) ==
- French explorer Michel Siffre began a long-term experiment of chronobiology, the perception of the passage of time in the absence of information, staying underground in a cave for two months after entering. While inside, he used a one-way field telephone to signal to researchers when he was going to sleep, when he was getting up, and how much time had passed between events during his waking hours. He was brought back out 60 days later on September 14, 1962. According to his diary, he thought only 35 days had passed and that the date was August 20.
- Prime Minister of Liechtenstein Alexander Frick resigned and was succeeded by Gerard Batliner.

== July 17, 1962 (Tuesday) ==
- The U.S. Senate voted 52–48 against further consideration of President Kennedy's proposed plan for Medicare, government-subsidized health care for persons drawing social security benefits. Two liberal U.S. Senators had switched sides, preventing a 50–50 tie that would have been broken in favor of Medicare by Vice-President Johnson. As President, Johnson would sign Medicare into law effective July 30, 1965.
- Major Robert M. White (USAF) piloted a North American X-15 to a record altitude of 314,750 feet (59.612 mi; 95.94 km), narrowly missing the 100 kilometer altitude Kármán line that defines outer space, but passing the 50-mile altitude mark that NASA used to define the threshold of space. The record of 67 miles (108 km) would be set by Joseph A. Walker on July 19, 1963.
- The Eritrean Liberation Front staged its first major attack in seeking to separate Eritrea from Ethiopia, by throwing a hand grenade at a reviewing stand that included General Abiy Abebe (Emperor Haile Selassie's representative), Eritrean provincial executive Asfaha Woldemikael, and Hamid Ferej, leader of the Eritrean provincial assembly.
- Four years after the USS Nautilus had become the first submarine to reach the geographic North Pole, the Soviet Union reached the Pole with a sub for the first time, with the submarine K-3 (later renamed the Leninsky Komsomol).
- The final atmospheric nuclear test by the United States was made, a test shot Little Feller I (of a "Small Boy" weapon).

== July 18, 1962 (Wednesday) ==
- Manuel Prado Ugarteche, the 73-year-old President of Peru, was arrested during a coup d'etat after Peruvian Army officers used a Sherman tank to batter down the gates of the presidential palace in Lima. Prado was replaced by a military junta led by General Ricardo Pérez Godoy. The election results of June 10 were annulled.
- The largest space vehicle, up to that time, began orbiting the Earth, after the United States launched the communications satellite "Big Shot". After going aloft, the silvery balloon was inflated to its full size as a sphere with a diameter of 135 feet (41 m).
- Unpopular and unable to implement economic reforms, Ali Amini resigned as Prime Minister of Iran. He would be replaced by Asadollah Alam.
- The Minnesota Twins became the first Major League Baseball team to hit two grand slams in the same inning of a game, as Bob Allison and Harmon Killebrew drove in eight runs in the first inning of a 14–3 win over the Cleveland Indians. In 50 years, the feat has been accomplished seven more times since then, most recently on September 11, 2015, in the eighth inning of a 14 to 8 win by the Baltimore Orioles over the Kansas City Royals. On April 23, 1999, both of the St. Louis Cardinals' grand slams in the third inning were made by the same batter, Fernando Tatis.
- Typhoon Kate, which would kill at least 110 people in Taiwan and in Communist China, formed a short distance from northern Luzon in the Philippines.
- Born: Abu Sabaya, Philippine leader of rebel group Abu Sayyaf; as Aldam Tilao in Isabela, Basilan (killed, 2002)
- Died: Eugene Houdry, 70, French chemical engineer who developed high octane gasoline and the catalytic converter

== July 19, 1962 (Thursday) ==
- The first successful intercept of one missile by another took place at Kwajalein Island, with a Zeus missile passing within 2 kilometres (1.2 mi) of an incoming Atlas missile, close enough for a nuclear warhead to disable an enemy weapon.
- Gemini Project Office and North American Aviation agreed on guidelines for the design of the advanced paraglider trainer, the system to be used with the Gemini spacecraft. The most important of these guidelines was redundancy for all critical operations.

== July 20, 1962 (Friday) ==
- Tou Samouth, Communist leader of the Khmer People's Revolutionary Party in Cambodia, disappeared and was presumed to have been murdered. His successor, Saloth Sar, would go on to lead the Communist Party of Kampuchea as Pol Pot, and then exact revenge on former government employees.
- Executive Order 11307 prohibited unlicensed U.S. citizens (and people under U.S. jurisdiction) from possessing or holding an interest in gold coins from outside the United States, unless the coins were of "exceptional numismatic value".
- The world's first regular passenger hovercraft service was introduced, as the VA-3 began the 20-mile (32 km) run between Rhyl (in Wales) and Wallasey (in England).
- France and Tunisia reestablished diplomatic relations, a year after breaking ties following the Bizerte crisis.
- NASA Administrator James E. Webb announced that a new mission control center would be established at the Manned Spacecraft Center (MSC) in Houston. Project Mercury flights were controlled from the center at Cape Canaveral, but these facilities were inadequate for the more complex missions envisioned for the Gemini and Apollo programs. Philco Corporation was awarded the contract for a design concept for the flight information and control functions of the new center, and the U.S. Army Corps of Engineers would supervise construction of this center as it had all major facilities at MSC. Total cost was estimated at $30 million for the center, to open in 1964 for Gemini space rendezvous flights.
- Born:
  - Carlos Alazraqui, American voice actor and stand-up comedian; in Yonkers, New York
  - Jeong Han Kim, South Korean mathematician; in Seoul

== July 21, 1962 (Saturday) ==
- The United Arab Republic (Egypt) successfully fired four missiles which, President Gamal Abdel Nasser said, could strike any target "just south of Beirut", a reference to neighboring Israel. Nasser said that the Nakid El Kaher (Conqueror) missile had a range of 380 miles (610 km), which could reach all of Israel, as well as cities in Syria and Jordan, and that the El Zahir (Victory) missile had a range of 222 miles (357 km), including Tel Aviv. The missiles came as a surprise to Israel's intelligence service, the Mossad. In August, Mossad chief Isser Harel would report to Prime Minister David Ben-Gurion that German scientists were assisting in the development of 900 more missiles capable of carrying chemical and biological weapons and would organize Operation Damocles to target the scientists on the project.
- Died: G. M. Trevelyan, 86, British historian

== July 22, 1962 (Sunday) ==
- The Mariner 1 spacecraft flew erratically several minutes after launch from the U.S. and had to be destroyed after less than five minutes, at a cost of $4,000,000 for the satellite and $8,000,000 for the rocket. The $12 million dollar loss was later traced to the omission of an overbar in the handwritten text from which the computer programming for the rocket guidance system was drawn, which should have been written as :$\bar{\dot{R}_n}$ being rendered as :${\dot{R}_n}$; thus, there was no smooth function to prevent over-correction of minor variations of data on rocket velocity.
- On Canadian Pacific Flight 301, 27 of the 40 people were killed after the four-engine plane had a failure of one engine shortly after takeoff on departure from Honolulu. The airliner crashed during an emergency landing, with only 13 survivors.
- Born:
  - Steve Albini, American musician, audio engineer, and music journalist; in Pasadena, California (died from a heart attack, 2024)
  - Ilyasah Shabazz, third daughter of Malcolm X and Betty Shabazz; in New York City

== July 23, 1962 (Monday) ==
- While in Geneva, W. Averell Harriman of the U.S. met with North Vietnam's Foreign Minister, Ung Văn Khiêm in an unsuccessful attempt to talk about a similar neutrality agreement in Vietnam. Decades after the end of the Vietnam War, sources in Hanoi would reveal that the North Vietnamese Politburo had approved the pursuit of discussions, but that Khiem had not been informed of the Politburo decision that might have averted a protracted war. American and North Vietnamese diplomats would not meet again for six years.
- Telstar relayed the first live trans-Atlantic television signal, with two 20-minute programs. The first was a set of U.S. TV shows (President Kennedy's news conference, 90 seconds of the Phillies-Cubs baseball game, and the Mormon Tabernacle Choir) to Eurovision (2:00 p.m. New York, 8:00 p.m. London). At 4:58 p.m., New York Time, live transmission of European broadcasting was shown on all three American networks, beginning with a live picture of the clock at London's Big Ben approaching 11:00 p.m.
- A railway crash killed 36 people and injured 100, when a train between Paris and Marseille derailed while crossing a viaduct near Dijon. Most of the dead were vacationers traveling to the French Riviera, and had been on a passenger car that plunged into a ravine.
- The International Agreement on the Neutrality of Laos was signed in Geneva. Under the agreement, all foreign military personnel were to withdraw within 75 days; the last Americans, advisers to the U.S. Special Forces, would leave by October 6.
- In the first press conference broadcast by satellite, U.S. President Kennedy blamed the Soviet Union for the resumption of nuclear testing and the inflexibility about the Berlin crisis.
- The Saskatoon agreement brought an end to the Saskatchewan doctors' strike.
- Born: Eriq La Salle, African-American TV actor; in Hartford, Connecticut
- Died:
  - Henry Dworshak, 67, U.S. Senator from Idaho since 1949. Dworshak was the fourth conservative Republican U.S. Senator to die in less than a year.
  - Victor Moore, 86, American stage and film actor best known for It Happened on 5th Avenue

== July 24, 1962 (Tuesday) ==
- In Geneva, after the ending of the conference about Laos, five Ministers for Foreign Affairs (the American Dean Rusk, the English Lord Home, the Canadian Howard Charles Green, the Soviet Andrej Gromyko and the Indian Krishna Menon) had a new meeting about the disarmament and the Berlin crisis. Notwithstanding the cordial atmosphere, no progress was obtained about the two questions.
- The first successful implantation of a biological heart valve was performed by Dr. Donald Nixon Ross in London, with a subcoronary implantation of an aortic allograft.
- The government of Italy's Prime Minister Amintore Fanfani enacted a law providing for free textbooks for primary school students.
- Died:
  - Margaret Buckley, 83, Irish Republican leader who served as President of Sinn Féin, Ireland's ruling political party, from 1937 to 1950
  - Victor Bourgeois, 64, Belgian modernist architect

== July 25, 1962 (Wednesday) ==
- Three weeks after Algeria became independent, civil war broke out within the FLN between the Provisional Government of the Algerian Republic (GPRA) of Ahmed Ben Bella and the Oujda group of Boumédiène. Ben Bella's troops occupied Bona and Constantine, with bloodshed, while the GPRA held control only of the Algiers region.
- "Aid to Families with Dependent Children" (AFDC) was created with the passage of the Public Welfare Amendments of 1962 to the U.S. Social Security Act, increasing the number of people receiving federal public assistance.
- Buckingham Palace, residence of the Queen of the United Kingdom, was opened to the public for the first time with the dedication of the Queen's Gallery, an art museum.
- "Skyphone" service, permitting airline passengers to make telephone calls while in flight, was inaugurated. The first call was made from American Airlines Flight 941 en route from New York to Cincinnati, from stewardess Hope Patterson to the Associated Press.
- The U.S. had another failure in its Operation Dominic series of nuclear tests, when a Thor missile exploded on the launch pad at Johnston Island. Although the 100-kiloton warhead was destroyed without a nuclear blast, the area was contaminated with plutonium, ending plans to routinely launch nuclear-powered space probes.
- The United States Army formed its first armed helicopter unit, using UH-1 Hueys.
- Born: Doug Drabek, American Major League Baseball pitcher from 1986 to 1998, and 1990 Cy Young Award winner; in Victoria, Texas
- Died:
  - Thibaudeau Rinfret, 83, Chief Justice of Canada from 1944 to 1954
  - Nelle Wilson Reagan, 79, mother of future U.S. President Ronald Reagan
  - Christie MacDonald, 87, Canadian-American actress and singer

== July 26, 1962 (Thursday) ==
- The first nuclear missiles shipped to Cuba by the Soviet Union were unloaded in at the port of Mariel. Their discovery would precipitate the Cuban Missile Crisis.
- The first birth defects in the United States from the drug thalidomide were detected. The unborn child's mother asked the Supreme Court of Arizona State for an order permitting her to abort her fifth pregnancy. In previous months, she had used the controversial medication, which was banned in the U.S., but had been bought by her husband in London. Her request was rejected.
- To celebrate the tenth anniversary of the founding of the republic in Egypt, President Nasser declared an end to tuition in the nation's universities.
- The French Chef, starring Julia Child, appeared on television for the first time, as a program on the Boston public television station WGBH.
- The first phone call by satellite between Italy and the United States took place. Osvaldo Cagnasso, the mayor of Alba in Piedmont, called his counterpart, Mayor John Snider in Medford, Oregon. The mayors of the twinned cities exchanged their greetings, in the call relayed by Telstar 1, for 12 minutes. In the hours that followed, the satellite broadcast another 11 calls from one side of the Atlantic to the other.
- In Algeria, during the split within the GPRA, Belkacem Krim and Boudiaf got the Kabylie to organize the resistance to Ben Bella's army. Benkhedda remained in Algiers to cooperate with the opposing faction.
- Born:
  - Galina Chistyakova, retired Russian athlete who currently holds the world record in the long jump, jumping 7.52 metres on June 11, 1988; in Izmail, Ukrainian SSR, Soviet Union
  - Sergey Kiriyenko, Prime Minister of Russia from March to August 1998; in Sukhumi, Georgian SSR, Soviet Union
- Died:
  - Matt Cvetic, 53, American government employee who infiltrated the U.S. Communist Party, then wrote about it in I Was a Communist for the FBI, died of a heart attack
  - Raquel Meller, 74, Spanish singer and actress

== July 27, 1962 (Friday) ==
- Inventor David P. Wagner applied for the patent for the first pharmaceutical packaging designed for compliance with dosage directions, to simplify use of birth control pills on a specific date. Wagner would receive royalties from G.D. Searle & Company and from Ortho Pharmaceutical, who would use the design for their contraceptives.
- Jess Oliver (Oliver Jsesperson) applied for the patent for the Ampeg B-15 Portaflex portable bass amplifier, which would become the most popular bass amplifier in the world for bands. The patent would be granted on May 11, 1965.
- The Church of Jesus Christ of Latter-day Saints began its project to acquire and restore properties in the small town of Nauvoo, Illinois, where the Mormons had been centered from 1839 to 1844. Within a year, Nauvoo Restoration, Inc., had acquired 30 of the 35 buildings still standing in Nauvoo.
- Atlas launch vehicle No. 113-D was inspected at Convair and accepted for the Mercury 8 orbital mission, scheduled for September 1962 for astronaut Wally Schirra.
- Born: Mariela Castro Espin, Cuban sexologist, niece of Fidel Castro; in Havana
- Died: Richard Aldington, 70, English poet and author

== July 28, 1962 (Saturday) ==
- A 103–26 vote of delegates to the German Football Association (DFB) convention at Dortmund created the Bundesliga, the national league of West Germany's top professional soccer football teams. The Bundesliga would begin its first season on August 24, 1963, with 16 teams out of 46 applicants.
- South Korea's President Park Chung Hee issued the memorandum "The Establishment of a Social Security System" and set about to forcibly implement programs for assistance for the elderly, disabled and unemployed in what was, at that time, a poor nation.
- The USSR launched Kosmos 7, the first successful Soviet mission to conduct surveillance photography of the entire United States.
- A railway crash killed 19 people and injured 116 at Steelton, Pennsylvania. The nine-car Pennsylvania Railroad train was carrying baseball fans to the Pirates-Phillies baseball game at Philadelphia, when the last five cars went off track, and three fell down a 40-foot (12 m) embankment.
- Race riots broke out in Dudley, West Midlands, in the UK.
- Born: Jason Sherman, Canadian playwright and screenwriter; in Montreal

== July 29, 1962 (Sunday) ==
- Sir Oswald Mosley, who had founded the British Union of Fascists and been a vocal Nazi sympathizer prior to Germany's attack on Britain in World War II, was beaten by an angry crowd in Manchester, after leading members of his extreme right-wing Union Movement on a march through the city.
- A few weeks after Algeria had attained its independence, 2,000 rebel guerrillas under the command of Colonel Si Hassan seized control of Algiers.
- In the final of the 1962 Speedway World Team Cup at Slaný in Czechoslovakia, the five-member motorcycle speedway team of Sweden finished in first place with 36 points, followed by Great Britain (24), Poland (20) and Czechoslovakia (16). Sweden's Björn Knutson and Soren Sjösten were the best of the riders, each with 10 points.
- Born: Scott Steiner, American college and professional wrestler; as Scott Rechsteiner in Bay City, Michigan
- Died: Sir Ronald Fisher, 72, English biologist

== July 30, 1962 (Monday) ==
July 30, 1962: The Trans-Canada Highway opens to traffic

- The Trans-Canada Highway was opened at a ceremony to mark the completion of the 92-mile (148 km) long Rogers Pass Highway through the Canadian Rockies, for the final link of the nearly 5,000-mile (8,000 km) system between St. John's, Newfoundland, and Victoria, British Columbia. B.C. Premier W. A. C. Bennett snipped a ribbon near Revelstoke.
- Marilyn Monroe made a final telephone call to the U.S. Justice Department, six days before her death. Monroe had been a regular caller to U.S. Attorney General Robert F. Kennedy, and historians speculate that he told her during the eight-minute phone call that they could no longer see each other. Monroe's phone records would be confiscated by the FBI, but Kennedy's phone logs would be donated to the National Archives after his death.
- U.S. President Kennedy agreed to halt reconnaissance flights over Soviet ships in the Caribbean Sea, after USSR Premier Khrushchev proposed the idea "for the sake of better relations"; in the two months that followed, the ships delivered missiles to Cuba.
- On the same day, President Kennedy began tape-recording conversations in the White House.
- Born: Alton Brown, American chef and host of the Food Network show Good Eats; in Los Angeles
- Died: Helge Krog, 73, Norwegian journalist

== July 31, 1962 (Tuesday) ==
- The professional football career of Ernie Davis, who had been the #1 choice in the 1962 NFL draft, ended three days before he was to begin play for the Cleveland Browns in the preseason College All-Star Game in Chicago. Davis had checked into the Memorial Hospital in the suburb of Evanston, Illinois, on suspicion that he had the mumps, and then with mononucleosis. The next day, it was announced that he had a "blood disorder", and in October, it would be revealed that he had leukemia, the disease that would claim his life the following May 18.
- A large annular solar eclipse covered 97% of the Sun, creating a dramatic spectacle for observers in a path up to 102.5 kilometres (63.7 mi) wide across South America's Caribbean coast and across Southern Africa. The eclipse lasted 3 minutes and 32.66 seconds at the point of maximum eclipse.
- The Vietnam Era began for Australia, with the arrival of Colonel Ted Serong, followed by 30 advisers later in the week. Over ten years, ending on December 2, 1972, there would be 521 Australians killed in the war.
- A symposium outlining a future U.S. space station was held at Langley Research Center in Virginia.
- Born:
  - Luis Castiglioni, Vice President of Paraguay from 2003 to 2007; Minister of Foreign Affairs from 2018 to 2019; in Itacurubí del Rosario
  - Wesley Snipes, American film actor; in Orlando, Florida
- Died:
  - Clarence E. Willard, 79, American circus performer who could alter his height from 5 feet 10 inches (1.78 m) to 6 feet 4 inches (1.93 m) through muscle manipulation.
  - Niels Miller, 63, American inventor and founder of the Miller Electric manufacturer of arc welding equipment
  - George Pepperdine, 76, American philanthropist and founder (in 1937) of Pepperdine University
