= June 1962 =

Month of 1962

<<	June 1962					>>
Su	Mo	Tu	We	Th	Fr	Sa
					1	2
3	4	5	6	7	8	9
10	11	12	13	14	15	16
17	18	19	20	21	22	23
24	25	26	27	28	29	30

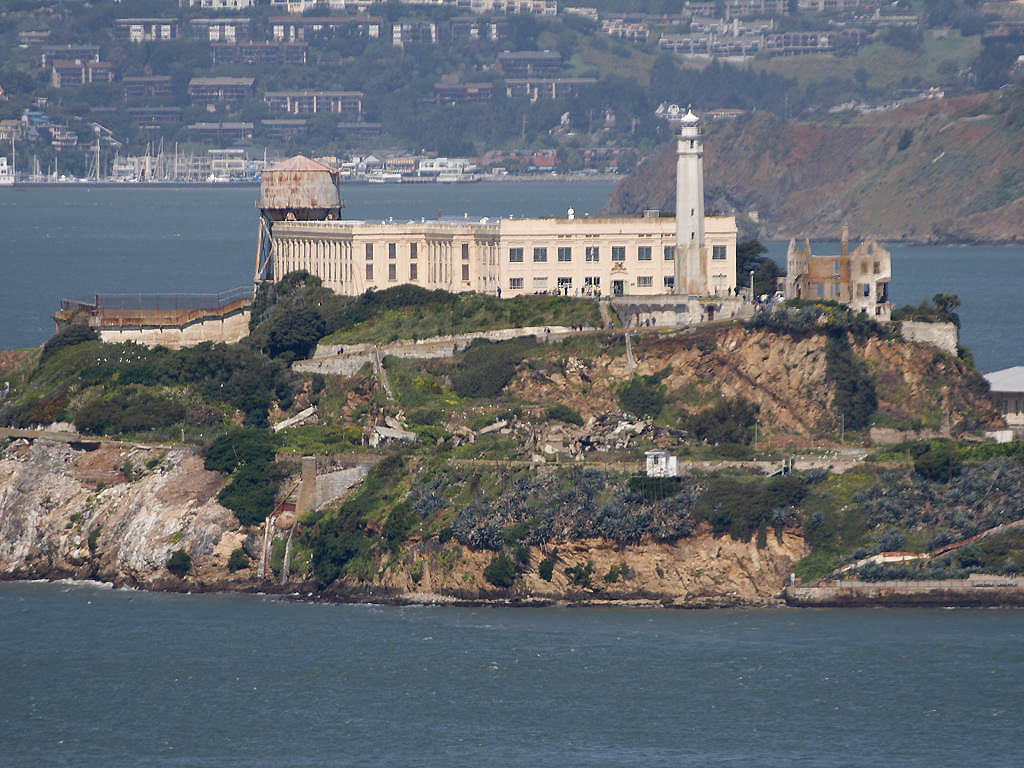
June 11, 1962: Three prisoners manage to escape from Alcatraz

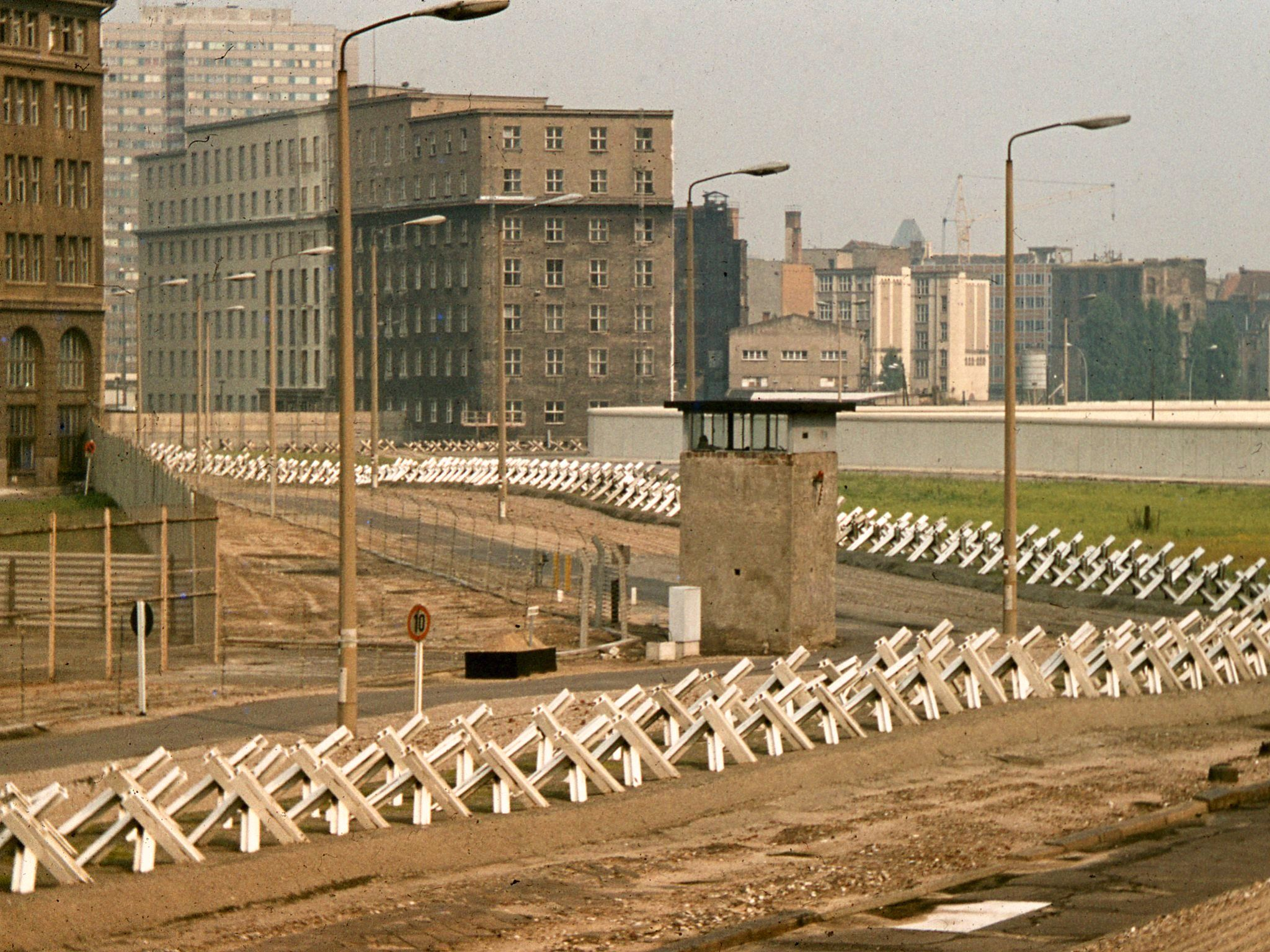
June 19, 1962: Escape from East Berlin to be made more difficult

The following events occurred in June 1962:

== June 1, 1962 (Friday) ==
- The Soviet Union raised the price of consumer goods by more than 25 percent in order to cover higher operating expenses for the USSR's collective farm program. Butter was up 25%, and pork and beef by 30%. In protest, workers walked off of the job at the Novocherkassk Electric Locomotive Factory and the strike soon turned into an uprising.
- A list of the aerospace ground equipment required to handle and check out the Gemini spacecraft before flight was presented at the first spacecraft operations coordination meeting.
- Died:
  - Adolf Eichmann, 56, German SS officer and war criminal, was hanged at Israel's Ramlah prison, after his conviction for war crimes
  - Josef Ospelt, 81, first Prime Minister of Liechtenstein

== June 2, 1962 (Saturday) ==
- The day after price rises took effect in the Soviet Union, protests in the city of Novocherkassk were brutally suppressed in what is remembered as the Novocherkassk massacre of 23 demonstrators. Strikers marched to the center of town, where they were joined by other protesters. After word spread that some of the strike leaders had been arrested, the local Communist party headquarters was invaded, after which the group marched into the police station and at 1:10 p.m., after firing a warning volley of shots, one of the units of soldiers fired into the crowd. It would be revealed 30 years later that 23 people were killed, and 116 arrested. Of those arrested, seven were convicted of sedition and executed, while others received prison terms ranging from 10 to 15 years. The news was kept out of the Soviet press. Months later, unofficial reports in the West referred to "hundreds" of deaths and in 1976, Alexander Solzhenitsyn's book The Gulag Archipelago would report that there had been more than 70 deaths. The Soviet government would finally confirm the killings on June 3, 1989, in an article in Komsomolskaya Pravda.
- El Porteñazo, a military rebellion, was launched in Venezuela.
- Born: Paula Newby-Fraser, Zimbabwean triathlete and eight time gold medalist in women's Ironman World Championship; in Salisbury, Southern Rhodesia (now Harare, Zimbabwe)
- Died: Vita Sackville-West, 70, English poet, novelist and landscape gardener died from cancer.

== June 3, 1962 (Sunday) ==
- All 122 passengers on Air France Flight 007 were killed, along with 8 of 10 crew members, overran the runway on takeoff from Orly Airport in Paris, at 12:29 p.m. local time. Two flight attendants survived. Most of the passengers (106 of 122) were cultural and civic leaders of the Atlanta Art Association, returning home from a tour of Europe. The Boeing 707, nicknamed the Chateau de Sully, crashed through an airport fence and into the woods near the village of Villeneuve-le-Roi.
- The 1954 peace agreement between India and China, which had taken effect on June 4, 1959, expired pursuant to its Article 6, "This Agreement shall remain in force for eight years". The two most populous nations in the world would fight the Sino-Indian War beginning on October 20.
- The Albanian parliamentary election was won by candidates of the only party on the ballot, the Communist Democratic Front, which officially received 889,868 of the 889,875 votes cast. The other seven were "no" votes against the slate of candidates.
- The 1962 Six Hour Le Mans was run at the Caversham Airfield circuit in Western Australia and won by Derek Jolly and John Roxburgh.
- The 1962 Monaco Grand Prix was won by Bruce McLaren.

== June 4, 1962 (Monday) ==
- Plans to detonate an American nuclear weapon, 40 miles (64 km) above the Earth, were halted one minute and 40 seconds before the scheduled explosion. Failure of the tracking system in the Thor missile led to the decision to blow the warhead apart without an atomic blast.
- The first atomic energy was generated in Canada as the Nuclear Power Demonstration went online at Rolphton, Ontario.
- In the Bolivian legislative election, a new National Congress was elected for one-third of the seats.
- The U.S. Air Force School of Aviation Medicine at Brooks Air Force Base in Texas, began a simulated long-duration Project Gemini mission. Two men were to live for 14 days in a 100-percent-oxygen atmosphere maintained at a pressure of 5 pounds per square inch (34 kPa), the proposed spacecraft environment.
- The 1962 Isle of Man TT races were held at the Snaefell Mountain Course. Winners included Luigi Taveri, Derek Minter and Ernst Degner.
- Died:
  - Bela Lapusnyik, 26, Hungarian intelligence officer, died four weeks after defecting to Austria and four days after suddenly becoming ill, apparently from poisoning. Lapusnyik had provided secrets to Western investigators until his unexpected illness.
  - Clem McCarthy, 79, American sportscaster
  - William Beebe, 84, American ornithologist

== June 5, 1962 (Tuesday) ==
- Spider-Man, created by Stan Lee and Steve Ditko, was introduced by Marvel Comics with the publication of Amazing Fantasy#15, with a cover date of August 1962. The issue was placed on newsstands on June 5, 1962, according to the copyright renewal filed in 1990.
- Hendrik Meijer and Frederik Meijer opened the first Thrifty Acres hypermarket in the United States. It combined a grocery store and a large department store, in Grand Rapids, Michigan, inaugurating the "supercenter" concept in groceries.
- Former U.S. Vice-President Richard M. Nixon won the Republican Party nomination for Governor of California, to challenge the Democratic nominee, Governor Pat Brown.
- The Honda S360 was unveiled at the 11th National Honda Meeting General Assembly, held at Suzuka Circuit.
- William Philbin was appointed Bishop of Down and Connor in Ireland.
- Born:
  - Princess Astrid of Belgium, Archduchess of Austria-Este, former President of the Belgian Red Cross; in Laeken
  - Jeff Garlin, American actor and comedian; in Chicago
- Died:
  - Sandra Tewkesbury, 20, Canadian Olympic figure skater was killed in a car accident in Guelph, Ontario.
  - Jacques Gréber, 79, French architect

== June 6, 1962 (Wednesday) ==
- Helicopter pilot Ron Boyd led Canadian searchers to the wreckage of a Fairchild 24 single-engine plane that had been missing since August 28, 1951, along with the skeletons of Toronto Maple Leafs star Bill Barilko and pilot Henry Hudson. Another helicopter pilot, Cary Fields, had spotted signs of the wrecked plane on May 31. The crash site was found about 100 kilometres (62 mi) north of Cochrane, Ontario, about 35 miles (56 km) off course.
- Whirlpool Corporation Research Laboratories received a contract to provide the Project Gemini food and waste management system, comprising water dispenser, food storage, and waste storage components. Food and zero-gravity feeding devices were to be provided by the U.S. Army Quartermaster Corps Food and Container Institute. MSC's Life Systems Division was responsible for directing the development program.
- McDonnell Aircraft Corporation was authorized to procure an additional boilerplate Gemini spacecraft for parachute landing system tests. McDonnell estimated that installing a new boilerplate would cost less ($12,000) than modifying the existing boilerplate for at least $17,000.
- Woolco, the attempt by the F.W. Woolworth Company to enter the discount department store market, opened its first store, in Columbus, Ohio.
- U.S. President John F. Kennedy gave the commencement address at the United States Military Academy at West Point in New York.
- The Beatles first auditioned for record producer George Martin at the Abbey Road Studios, London.
- Sir Henry Josiah Lightfoot Boston became the first indigenous Governor-General of Sierra Leone.
- France's Colonial Medal (Médaille Coloniale) was renamed the Médaille d'Outre-Mer ("Medal of the Overseas") for the outlying departments of France.
- Born: Albita Rodríguez, Cuban singer, producer and composer; in Havana
- Died:
  - Joe Profaci, 64, Italian-American Cosa Nostra boss who was the founder of the Colombo crime family (formerly the Profaci crime family) of New York City, died of liver cancer
  - Abba Ahimeir, 64, Jewish journalist, historian and political activist
  - Yves Klein, 34, French artist suffered a fatal heart attack

== June 7, 1962 (Thursday) ==
- President Kennedy announced in a press conference that he would seek "an across-the-board reduction in personal and corporate income taxes", commenting that "Our tax structure, as presently weighted, exerts too heavy a drain on a prospering economy." At the time, earnings of more than $200,000 were in a 91% federal tax bracket. On the same day, he presented a Congressional gold medal to the mother of Thomas Anthony Dooley III at a White House ceremony.
- Born:
  - Thierry Hazard (stage name for Thierry Gesteau, French singer; as in Compiègne, Oise
  - Lance Reddick, American actor; in Baltimore, Maryland (d. 2023)
- Died:
  - Albert Dovecar, 24, Croatian soldier, and Claude Piegts, 28, Algerian pied-noir, were both executed by firing squad at the Fort du Trou d'Enfer for their part in the assassination of French National Police Divisional Commissaire Roger Gavoury during the Algerian War.
  - Andrés Ignacio Menéndez, 83, who served as President of El Salvador from 1934 to 1935, and in 1944)

== June 8, 1962 (Friday) ==
- Pakistan's new constitution took effect, giving President Muhammad Ayub Khan veto power over a new, single-chamber National Assembly, elected by a group of 80,000 "basic democrats". The document would remain in effect until 1969.
- Marilyn Monroe was fired by 20th Century Fox because of her frequent absences from the filming of the movie Something's Got to Give. Over a course of seven weeks of shooting, she had only appeared on five days.
- Soviet authorities gave the go-ahead for the construction of the Ust-Ilimsk Hydroelectric Power Station.
- Sir Alfred Dudley Ward became Governor of Gibraltar.
- Bob Hope received the U.S. Congressional Gold Medal.
- The city of Villa Hills, Kentucky, was incorporated.
- Born: Bogusław Pawłowski, Polish biologist; in Prudnik
- Died: William Stanley Braithwaite, 82, American writer and poet

== June 9, 1962 (Saturday) ==
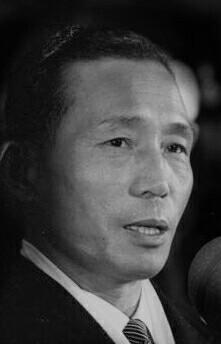
Park

- South Korea's military leader Park Chung Hee ordered a surprise currency reform, freezing all bank accounts and ordering that the South Korean hwan be exchanged by the end of Monday in favor of the new South Korean won, at the rate of 10 hwan for each new won. On June 16, a decree was issued to take individual bank account money, above a set limit, for a required purchase of stock in the government-owned Korean Industrial Development Corporation, and Park would later be forced to rescind both emergency measures under pressure from the United States.

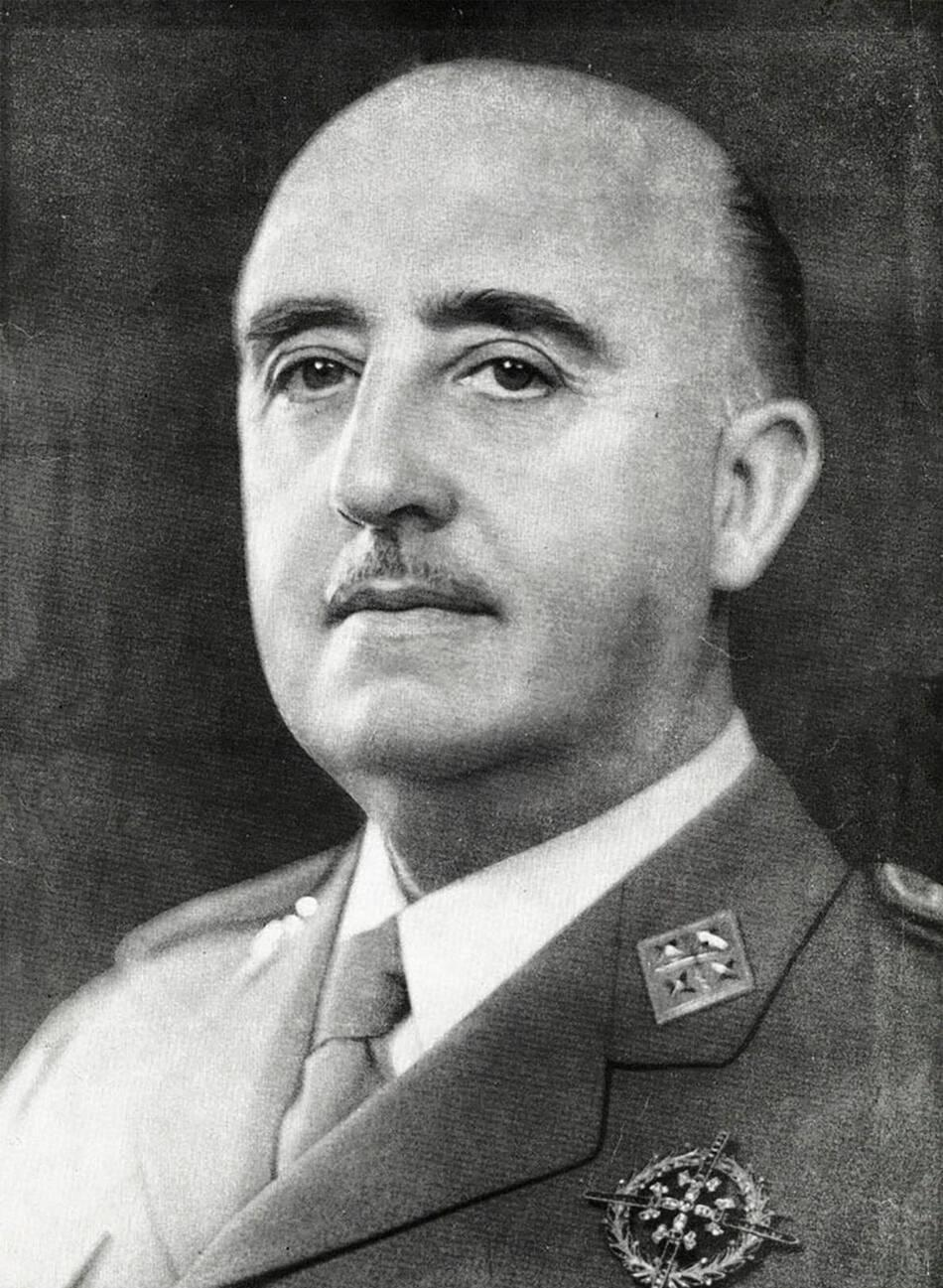
Franco

- Spain's dictator Francisco Franco announced a two-year suspension of the constitutional right of Spanish citizens to live elsewhere in the country. Franco limited the privilege to supporters of his government, in response to strikes that had halted activity in the nation.
- The best-selling live album Tony Bennett at Carnegie Hall was recorded. New York radio personality Jonathan Schwartz would later comment, "That was the night that Tony Bennett became Tony Bennett", as the singer performed 44 songs.
- As part of its immigration reform, Canada granted amnesty to Chinese persons who had entered the nation illegally prior to July 1, 1960.
- Died: Polly Adler, 62, Russian-born American bordello operator

== June 10, 1962 (Sunday) ==
- Operation Anadyr, to place Soviet nuclear missiles in Cuba, was approved unanimously by the Presidium of the Soviet Union on the recommendation of Defense Minister Rodion Malinovsky and Prime Minister Nikita Khrushchev. Under the plan, 24 medium-range nuclear missiles and 16 intermediate-range missiles would be placed in Cuba, and a total of 50,874 Soviet military personnel would be placed on the island to defend against an invasion. The decision would precipitate the Cuban Missile Crisis in October.
- In the elections for President of Peru, Víctor Raúl Haya de la Torre obtained more votes (557,047) than the other two major candidates, Fernando Belaúnde Terry (544,180) and former president Manuel A. Odría (480,798), while another 108,593 votes were split among four minor candidates. However, the Constitution required that a candidate receive at least one-third of the popular vote to win, and Haya had 32.95% of the 1,690,618 ballots cast, falling 6,493 votes short. Before the Congress of Peru could meet to decide the election, the government would be overthrown on July 18 and the results annulled. A new election would be held on June 6, 1963, with Belaúnde winning the presidency.
- The first popular vote in Cambodia took place, as citizens went to the polls to approve the Sangkum candidates for Parliament. Although there were no choices, an author notes that the election "did get people used to the mechanics of voting, which would be of significant value in 1966".
- Soviet athlete Igor Ter-Ovanesyan set a new world long jump record of 8.31 metres (27 ft 3 in), breaking the record set by Ralph Boston.
- Born: Gina Gershon, American film and TV actress, singer and author; in Los Angeles
- Died: Trygve Gulbranssen, 68, Norwegian novelist, businessman and journalist

== June 11, 1962 (Monday) ==
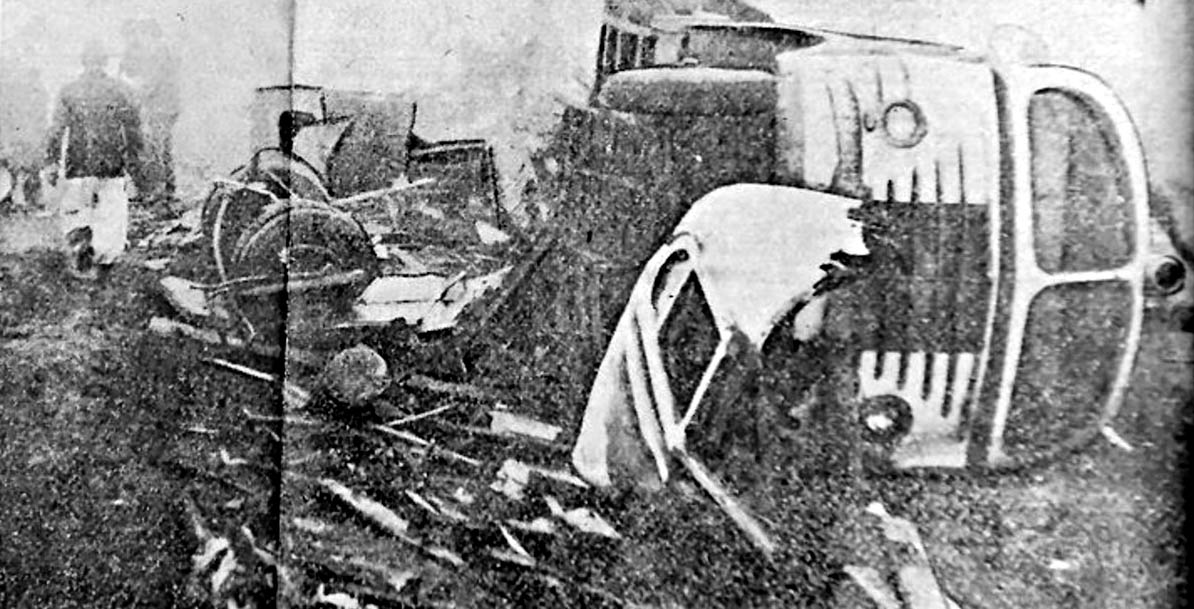
June 11, 1962: The bus shortly after the impact

- In Buenos Aires in Argentina, at least 31 schoolchildren were killed along with a teacher and a driver, when a municipal bus with 120 children on board crossed into the path of an oncoming train. Reportedly, a crossing attendant had raised a barrier to allow a truck to cross the tracks and the bus driver followed. Most of the dead were children less than 13 years old who lived on Lacarra Street in the Villa Soldati neighborhood and were on their way to school in a dense fog.
- Frank Morris, John Anglin and Clarence Anglin became the last prisoners to escape from the Alcatraz Island federal penitentiary. They were not recaptured, nor were their bodies ever located by searchers, and they were presumed to have drowned. Actor Clint Eastwood would later portray Morris in the 1979 film Escape from Alcatraz.
- A crisis in Laos, which threatened to become a major war, was resolved when warring princes Souvanna Phouma, Souphanouvong and Boun Oum agreed to form a coalition government.
- President Kennedy gave the commencement address at Yale University.
- Innes Ireland won the 1962 Crystal Palace Trophy motor race.

== June 12, 1962 (Tuesday) ==
- The mother of 15-year-old William Jefferson Blythe filed a petition to change her son's name, at his request, to that of her recently divorced husband. Afterward, Blythe would be known as Bill Clinton and would become President of the United States under that name in 1993.
- Three days before his high school graduation, 18-year-old George Lucas survived a near-fatal car crash caused by a fellow student. Lucas would abandon a dream to become a race car driver, and went on to become a successful filmmaker.
- The European Convention on Mutual Assistance in Criminal Matters entered into effect, after having been opened for signing on April 20, 1959.
- Born:
  - Michael Link, Caucasian-American child actor who co-starred on the 1968 sitcom Julia as "Earl J. Waggedorn"; in Provo, Utah
  - Michael Aondoakaa, Nigerian Justice Minister and Attorney General from 2007 to 2010; in Benue State
  - Jordan Peterson, Canadian psychologist and professor of psychology; in Edmonton
- Died: John Ireland, 82, English composer

== June 13, 1962 (Wednesday) ==
- Lee Harvey Oswald arrived back in the United States on the Dutch cruise ship S.S. Maasdam, after more than two years away in Russia. Oswald, who would be accused of killing U.S. President Kennedy less than 18 months later, brought with him his wife and daughter. The family was greeted on arrival in New York by Mr. Spas T. Rankin of the Travelers Aid Society of New York.
- The Manned Spacecraft Center proposed a recoverable meteoroid experiment with two sheets of aluminium to be extended from the Mercury spacecraft for a period of two weeks. The sheets would then be retracted into the spacecraft for protection during reentry and recovery.
- Rookie baseball pitcher Bo Belinsky, having spent the previous night partying with celebrities including Eddie Fisher, Dean Martin, Keely Smith and Henry Fonda, was arrested and charged with assaulting a nightclub attendant.
- Born: Ally Sheedy, American film actress known for WarGames and The Breakfast Club; in New York City

== June 14, 1962 (Thursday) ==
- Following a successful pilot episode shown in January, the classic British sitcom Steptoe and Son began its 12-year run on the BBC. Described as "the most popular situation comedy in British television history", the series about junk dealer Albert Steptoe (Wilfrid Brambell) and his son Harold (Harry H. Corbett) would later inspire an American counterpart, Sanford and Son.
- Anna E. Siesers, 55, was found dead in her apartment in Boston, raped and strangled to death. Before the end of the summer, four other women would be raped and strangled in and near Boston. They would be first victims of the serial killer nicknamed "The Boston Strangler".
- The Convention for a European Space Research Organisation was signed in Paris by ten European nations. It would take effect on March 20, 1964, and establish the forerunner of the European Space Agency.
- The West Lothian by-election in the UK, brought about by the death of the sitting MP, resulted in the election of Tam Dalyell.
- Died:
  - Bernie Babcock (Julia Bernelle Smade Babcock), 94, American novelist
  - Count Otto von Czernin, 86, Austro-Hungarian diplomat

== June 15, 1962 (Friday) ==
- Students for a Democratic Society completed the Port Huron Statement, written by Tom Hayden at the SDS convention in Port Huron, Michigan. The introductory statement was "We are people of this generation, bred in at least modest comfort, housed now in universities, looking uncomfortably to the world we inherit."
- The International Court of Justice voted 9–3 to award Preah Vihear to Cambodia rather than Thailand, resolving a dispute between the two nations.
- On the death of his father, Viscount Hinchingbrooke succeeded to the earldom of Sandwich, obliging him to give up his seat in the British House of Commons.
- The 1962 Atlantic hurricane season began, but no storms would form for another two months.
- Died:
  - Eugeniusz Baziak, 72, Roman Catholic Archbishop of Kraków. His successor would be Karol Wojtyla, who would, in 1978, become Pope John Paul II.
  - Alfred Cortot, 84, Swiss classical musician

== June 16, 1962 (Saturday) ==
- In the commencement address for the University of Michigan, U.S. Secretary of Defense Robert S. McNamara publicly announced a new nuclear strategy for the United States, declaring that "principal military objectives... should be the destruction of the enemy's military forces, not of his civilian population."
- The New Yorker magazine published the first of three excerpts of Rachel Carson's upcoming book, Silent Spring, receiving more response than it ever had for any previous article. Carson's book, credited with launching the environmental movement, would be published on September 27.
- South Korean Prime Minister Song Yo Chan and his cabinet resigned after disagreeing with General Park Chung Hee's drastic currency reform.
- Twenty years after Outward Bound had been launched in Wales, the first Outward Bound USA school, located at Marble, Colorado, was opened.
- English cricketer Geoffrey Boycott began his 24-year professional career, appearing for the Yorkshire County Cricket Club.
- Born:
  - Femi Kuti (Olufela Olufemi Kuti), British-born Nigerian musician and the eldest son to Fela Kuti; in London
  - Arnold Vosloo, South African stage, film and TV character actor generally cast as a villain; in Pretoria
- Died: Aleksei Antonov, 65, Soviet World War II general

== June 17, 1962 (Sunday) ==
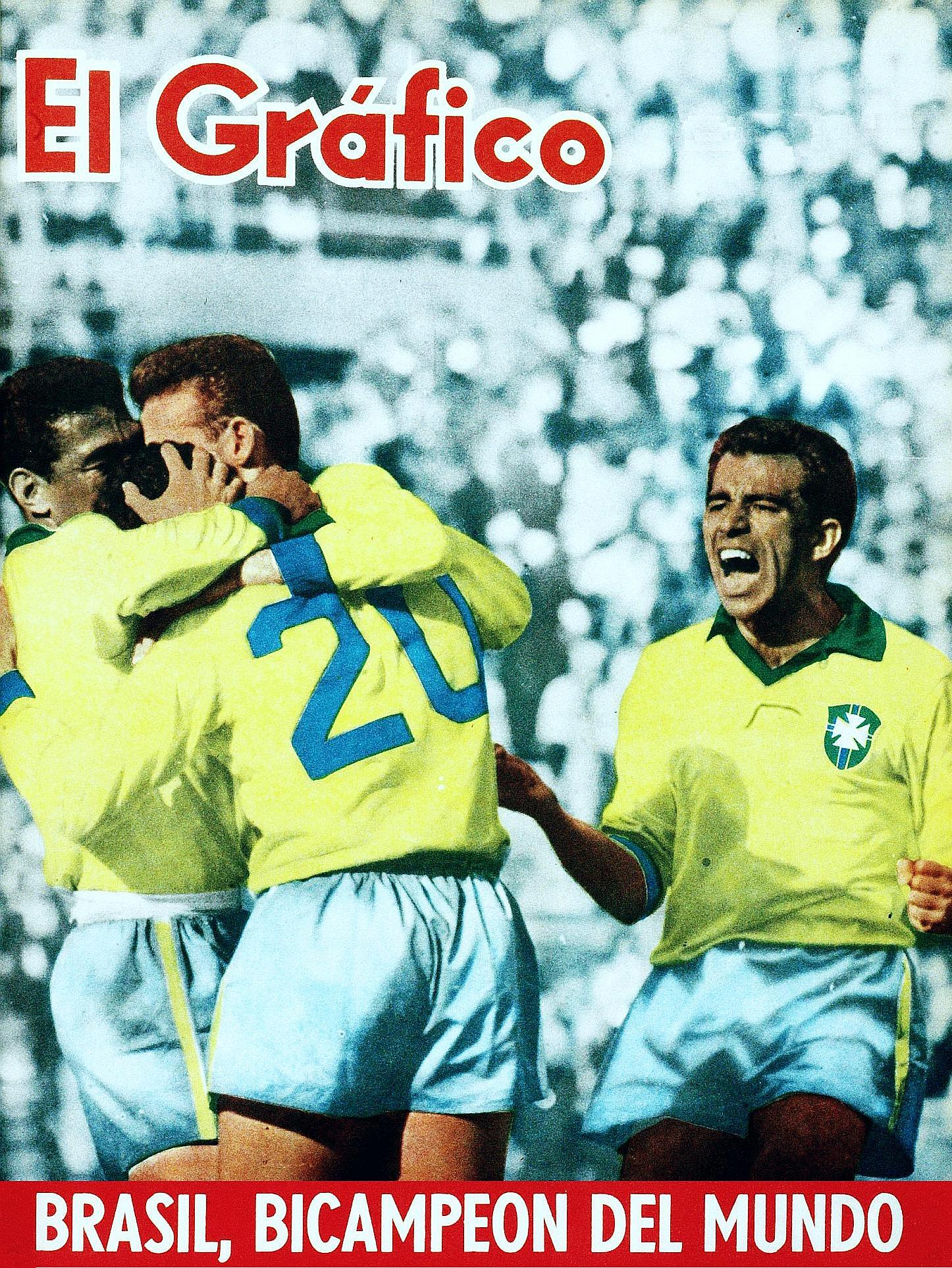
June 17, 1962: Brazilian national football team wins the World Cup (the cover of El Grafico magazine is headlined "Brazil, Champion of the World")

- Brazil beat Czechoslovakia 3–1 to win the 1962 FIFA World Cup Final, played in Santiago, Chile. Czechoslovakia was ahead 1–0 on a goal by Josef Masopust, eleven minutes into the game and the teams were tied 1–1 at halftime. Zito hit a goal from Brazil at the 69th minute for a 2–1 edge. At 78 minutes, in the second half, Czechoslovak goalkeeper Viliam Schrojf was blinded by the sun, allowing Brazil's Vavá to score the final goal for the 3–1 win.
- Jack Nicklaus, 22 years old at the time, won the U.S. Open golf tournament in a playoff against Arnold Palmer at Oakmont Country Club in Oakmont, Pennsylvania. The two had tied at 283 at the end of 72 holes the day before. On the 18-hole playoff, Nicklaus had 71 and Palmer 74. It was Nicklaus's first professional tournament victory, and the first of eighteen major championships he would win in his career.
- In the UK, British Railways closed the former South Eastern Railway motive power depot at Bricklayers Arms in London, after 118 years in operation.
- The OAS signed a truce with the FLN in Algeria, but a day later announced that it would continue the fight on behalf of French Algerians.

== June 18, 1962 (Monday) ==
- Scorpius X-1, the first cosmic X-ray source to be discovered by mankind, was found by instruments on an Aerobee rocket on a six-minute mission. A team at White Sands, New Mexico, led by physicist Riccardo Giacconi, had been looking only to measure the reflection of X-ray radiation from the Sun off of the Moon, and found far more. "Sco X-1" was later found to be matter from a normal star falling into a neutron star. The serendipitous discovery would later be heralded as the birth of X-ray astronomy.
- The 1962 Canadian federal election, saw Prime Minister John Diefenbaker's Progressive Conservative Party of Canada lose its majority in the House of Commons. The PCP was left with only 116 of the 265 seats, after having had 203, while Lester Pearson's Liberal Party increased its share from 49 to 100. Diefenbaker retained his office, but with a reconstituted ministry.
- Park Chung-hee replaced Song Yo Chan as Chief Minister of South Korea.

== June 19, 1962 (Tuesday) ==
- The Music Man, the film adaptation of Meredith Willson's 1957 Broadway musical of the same name, had its world premiere at the Palace Theater in Mason City, Iowa, Willson's hometown and his inspiration for the film's setting, the fictitious town of River City, Iowa. In addition to Willson, director Morton DaCosta, emcee Arthur Godfrey, and stars Robert Preston and Shirley Jones were guests; the day also featured a national high school marching band contest with entries from 30 states.
- The second phase of building the Berlin Wall was commenced. Not only was the outer wall along the border with West Berlin increased, but buildings along the border were torn down in order to clear an area that extended at least 30 metres (98 ft) further from the border. The in-between area was then filled with land mines and other deterrents to escape.
- A second American attempt at a nuclear explosion in outer space ended in failure, two weeks after the first try. Before the Thor missile could reach its altitude of 200 miles (320 km), the warhead was blown apart by ground control.
- Eric Gairy was dismissed as Chief Minister of Grenada, at that time a British colony, after a government inquiry found financial irregularities in the nation's budget.
- Born:
  - Paula Abdul, American singer/choreographer; in San Fernando, California
  - Jude Célestin, Haitian politician and presidential candidate; in Port-au-Prince
  - Ashish Vidyarthi, Indian film actor; in Delhi
- Died: Frank Borzage, 59, American film director; from cancer

== June 20, 1962 (Wednesday) ==
- Morocco halted the emigration of its Jewish minority after several months of permitting the group to depart the Muslim nation, primarily to Israel.
- John Coltrane recorded the jazz standard "Impressions".
- Born: Dennis Martin, an American child who disappeared on June 14, 1969, in the Great Smoky Mountains National Park in Tennessee at the age of six and has never been found since then

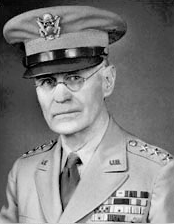
General DeWitt

- Died: General John L. DeWitt, 82, remembered primarily for recommending and co-ordinating the Japanese American internment of 110,000 American citizens during World War II.

== June 21, 1962 (Thursday) ==
- Joseph Valachi, imprisoned in Atlanta for narcotics trafficking, fatally assaulted another Atlanta inmate, John Joseph Saupp, whom he mistook for the mafioso Joseph di Palermo, believing that di Palermo had been contracted to kill him by his own cellmate, former Cosa Nostra boss Vito Genovese. While in solitary confinement Valachi would reveal critical information about the Mafia; he later testified in Congressional hearings, and his memoirs would become a bestselling publication, The Valachi Papers, and later a film.
- The first full-scale test of the Gemini paraglider was held at North American's Space and Information Systems Division. The Manned Spacecraft Center inspecting team reviewed the design of the full-scale paraglider wing and capsule, and suggested 33 changes, mostly related to hardware.
- The Tacuara Nationalist Movement, a Nazi gang in Argentina, kidnapped a 19-year-old Jewish student, Graciela Sirota, tortured her and carved a swastika on her body, as "revenge" for the elimination of Adolf Eichmann.
- The toxic defoliant Agent Orange was first tested, at a grassy area on the Eglin Air Force Base near Valparaiso, Florida.

== June 22, 1962 (Friday) ==
- All 113 people on Air France Flight 117 were killed when the Boeing 707 jet crashed into rough terrain during bad weather while attempting to land on the island of Guadeloupe in the West Indies. It was the airline's second fatal accident in 3 weeks, and the third fatal 707 crash of the year.
- Born: Clyde Drexler, American NBA player and Hall of Fame inductee; in New Orleans
- Died:
  - Justin Catayée, 46, French Guianan politician and war hero
  - Paul Niger, 46, French poet and activist. Both Catayée and Niger were killed in the crash of Air France Flight 117.

== June 23, 1962 (Saturday) ==
- The United States secretly sent word to the People's Republic of China that it would disassociate itself from any further plans by Nationalist China (on the island of Taiwan) to invade and retake the mainland from the Communists. Although the U.S. and Communist China did not have diplomatic relations at the time, both had ambassadors in Poland. In Warsaw, U.S. Ambassador John Moors Cabot spoke with China's Wang Ping-nan to communicate the decision, made on June 20. At the same time, the U.S. reiterated that it would defend Taiwan in the event of a Communist invasion.
- Don Newcombe, former Brooklyn Dodgers all-star pitcher, became the first Major League Baseball player to appear in a Japanese professional baseball game. The 36-year-old African-American debuted as a first baseman for the Chunichi Dragons of Nagoya, in a 5–4 win at Hiroshima over the Hiroshima Carp. Larry Doby, who had been the second African-American in Major League Baseball, would join Newcombe on the Dragons as the second American to play Japanese baseball.
- Born: Shriti Vadera, Baroness Vadera, British investment banker and politician; to Gujarati Indian parents in Uganda

== June 24, 1962 (Sunday) ==
- The visiting New York Yankees defeated the Detroit Tigers, 9–7, in a baseball game that took a record seven hours to complete, running from 1:30 p.m. to 8:30 p.m., after being tied 7–7 at the end of the usual nine innings. Although the 22 inning game was four short of the record of 26 (May 1, 1920, a 1–1 Dodgers/Braves tie), it beat the record of 5 hours, 19 minutes for a July 5, 1940 Dodgers 6–2 win over the Braves. The current MLB record was the Chicago White Sox's 7–6 win over the Milwaukee Brewers in 8 hours and 6 minutes (and 25 innings) on May 8–9, 1984.
- Malcolm Arnold's Concerto for Two Violins and String Orchestra premièred at the Bath International Music Festival, with Yehudi Menuhin and his pupil Alberto Lysy as soloists.
- American TV director Lawrence Dobkin married actress Joanna Barnes.
- The 1962 Tour de France cycle race began at Nancy.
- Born: Claudia Sheinbaum, Mexican politician who will be the first woman to be inaugurated as President of Mexico, with a term to begin on October 1, 2024; in Mexico City
- Died: Lucile Watson, 83, Canadian actress

== June 25, 1962 (Monday) ==
- In the case of Engel v. Vitale, the United States Supreme Court ruled, 6–1, that mandatory prayers in public schools were unconstitutional. The suit had been filed after the school board of New Hyde Park, New York had ordered each class to start the school day with the prayer, "Almighty God, we acknowledge our dependence upon Thee, and we beg Thy blessings upon us, our parents, our teachers, and our Country", under the recommendation of the state Board of Regents. The decision affected an estimated 39,000,000 public school students.
- FRELIMO, the Frente de Libertação de Moçambique, was founded in Tanganyika by a merger of the National Democratic Union of Mozambique, the National Union for the Independence of Mozambique, and the National African Union of Mozambique, with Eduardo Mondlane as its first president. Mozambique would gain independence from Portugal on June 25, 1975, under the leadership of FRELIMO leader Samora Machel, on the 13th anniversary of the organization's founding.
- Gemini Project Office completed a thorough study of the reentry tracking histories of the first four Mercury crewed space missions. The study indicated that a C-band radar tracking beacon should be integrated into the spacecraft reentry section in place of the planned S-band beacon to improve tracking of spacecraft reentry through the Earth's ionization zone.
- In the case of MANual Enterprises v. Day, the United States Supreme Court ruled that photographs of nude men were not obscene, decriminalizing nude male pornographic magazines, and applying the same standard, for erotic magazines aimed at heterosexual readers, to homosexual readers.
- Actress Sophia Loren and her husband, producer Carlo Ponti, were ordered to stand trial on bigamy charges.
- İsmet İnönü of Republican People's Party (CHP) formed the new government of Turkey. The cabinet was the 27th government for the Turkish Republic, as the CHP partnered in a coalition with the partners with the New Turkey Party (YTP) and the Nation Party (CKMP).

== June 26, 1962 (Tuesday) ==
- The Belgian trust territory of Ruanda-Urundi, scheduled to become independent in five days, was split into two nations, by a 93–0 vote of the United Nations General Assembly. On July 1, the Republic of Rwanda and the Kingdom of Burundi were created.
- U.S. Representative Roy A. Taylor of North Carolina became the first member of Congress to propose a constitutional amendment to overcome the Supreme Court's ruling banning prayer in public schools. Miller's suggested 24th Amendment stated "Notwithstanding the 1st or 14th Article of Amendment to the Constitution of the United States, prayers may be offered and the Bible may be read in connection with the program of any public school in the United States." In all, 56 Representatives and Senators offered amendments, none of which were approved for submission for ratification.
- Project Reef, an airdrop testing program to evaluate the Mercury 63-foot (19 m) ringsail main parachute's capability to support the higher spacecraft weight for an extended range mission, was completed. Tests indicated that the parachute was qualified to support a future crewed Mercury mission.
- A two-day strike of steelworkers began in Italy in order to bargain for increased wages and a 5-day working week.

== June 27, 1962 (Wednesday) ==
- After IBM rejected the idea of 32-year-old employee H. Ross Perot, to sell computer programs along with its equipment, Perot quit and invested $1,000 of his savings to create Electronic Data Systems (EDS). When Medicare was created in 1965, EDS contracted with two states to process the claims, turning the company into a multibillion-dollar corporation and making a billionaire of Perot.
- D. Brainerd Holmes, NASA Director of Manned Space Flight, announced that the Mercury 8 mission would be programmed for as many as six orbits. Wally Schirra was selected as the prime pilot, with Gordon Cooper serving as backup. NASA announced that Dr. Eugene B. Konecci had been appointed as Director of Biotechnology and Human Research, to be responsible for directing development of future life support systems to protect humans in the space environment.
- The Gemini Project Office and McDonnell decided that the most useful Gemini-related test by the Mercury project would be of the heatshield materials and afterbody-shingle characteristics. Samples of the Gemini heatshield would later be flown satisfactorily on the Mercury 8 mission.
- Born:
  - Michael Ball, English singer and actor; in Bromsgrove, Worcestershire
  - Tony Leung Chiu-Wai, Hong Kong film star; in British Hong Kong
- Died: Maria Dermoût, 74, Dutch East Indies-born Dutch novelist

== June 28, 1962 (Thursday) ==
- Four different Lutheran groups—the United Lutheran Church in America, the Finnish Evangelical Lutheran Church of America, the American Evangelical Lutheran Church, and the Augustana Evangelical Lutheran Church—merged to form the Lutheran Church in America, with 6,125 congregations and 3,186,310 members. At a ceremony at Detroit's Cobo Hall, four tall candles were put together to create one large flame.
- The Manned Spacecraft Center requested Langley Research Center's assistance in acoustic tests of ablation materials on Mercury flight tests, with Langley to prepare several material specimens to be tested for possible application in providing lightweight afterbody heat protection for Apollo class vehicles. Langley would report its test results on September 21.
- John Henry Faulk, an American disc jockey whose career had been ruined by false charges that he was a Communist, was awarded $3.5 million by a New York jury for compensatory and punitive damages for libel.
- Sir Winston Churchill fell and broke his hip during a visit to Monte Carlo in Monaco. He was flown to a London hospital where he remained for three weeks.
- Died: Mickey Cochrane, 59, American baseball player and manager, died of lymphatic cancer.

== June 29, 1962 (Friday) ==
- RKO Phonevision, a pay TV service operated by Zenith Radio Company, began a pay-per-view service in Hartford, Connecticut, sending scrambled signals in addition to the regular programming on WHCT Channel 18. On the first night, subscribers with Phonevision decoders (and one dollar) were able to watch the 1960 film Sunrise at Campobello with no commercial interruptions. The service never attracted enough subscribers to break even, and would be ended on January 31, 1969.
- Engineering was completed for the spacecraft reaction control system reserve fuel tank and related hardware in support of the Mercury extended range or one-day mission.
- Dynamo Tbilisi defeated Real Madrid, 90–83, to win the 1962 FIBA European Champions Cup Final and the club championship of European basketball.
- Born: Amanda Donohoe, English actress; in London

== June 30, 1962 (Saturday) ==
- Unrestricted immigration of British Empire subjects to the United Kingdom was curtailed as the Commonwealth Immigrants Act 1962 took effect, putting a quota on how many government vouchers would be issued for each nation. Restrictions would become stricter in 1971.
- David Lawrence, founder and owner of the news magazine U.S. News & World Report, turned control over to the 285 employees who had been working there for at least one year.
- The last soldiers of the French Foreign Legion left Algeria.
- Martin Marietta began its airborne systems functional tests as its 3,000-square-foot (280 m^{2}) facility went into operation at Baltimore. The components of the Titan II Gemini rocket equipment for flight control, hydraulic, electrical, instrumentation, and malfunction detection were assembled on tables using actual engines, but with simulated propellant tanks and guidance. The Baltimore facility also checked system design changes and did troubleshooting of problems encountered in other test programs.
- As of the close of Fiscal Year 1962, Houston's Manned Spacecraft Center was reported to have 1,802 personnel.
- Born:
  - Tony Fernández, Dominican MLB shortstop (d. 2020); in San Pedro de Macorís
- Died: Frederick Hazlitt Brennan, 60, American screenwriter who had created The Life and Legend of Wyatt Earp television series
