= August 1962 =

Month of 1962

<<	August 1962					>>
Su	Mo	Tu	We	Th	Fr	Sa
			1	2	3	4
5	6	7	8	9	10	11
12	13	14	15	16	17	18
19	20	21	22	23	24	25
26	27	28	29	30	31

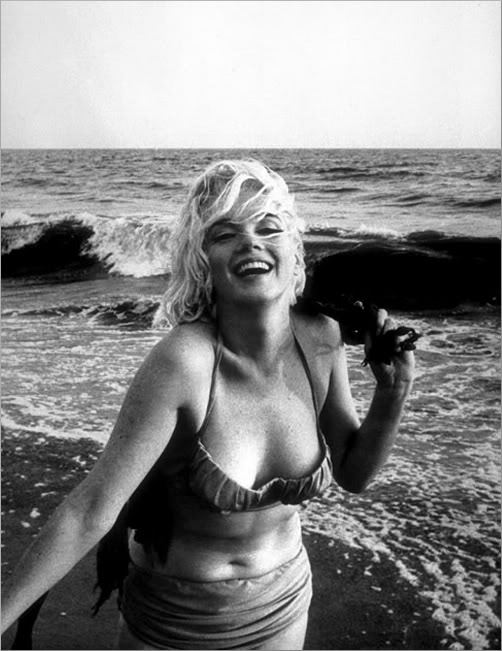
August 4, 1962: Marilyn Monroe takes fatal overdose

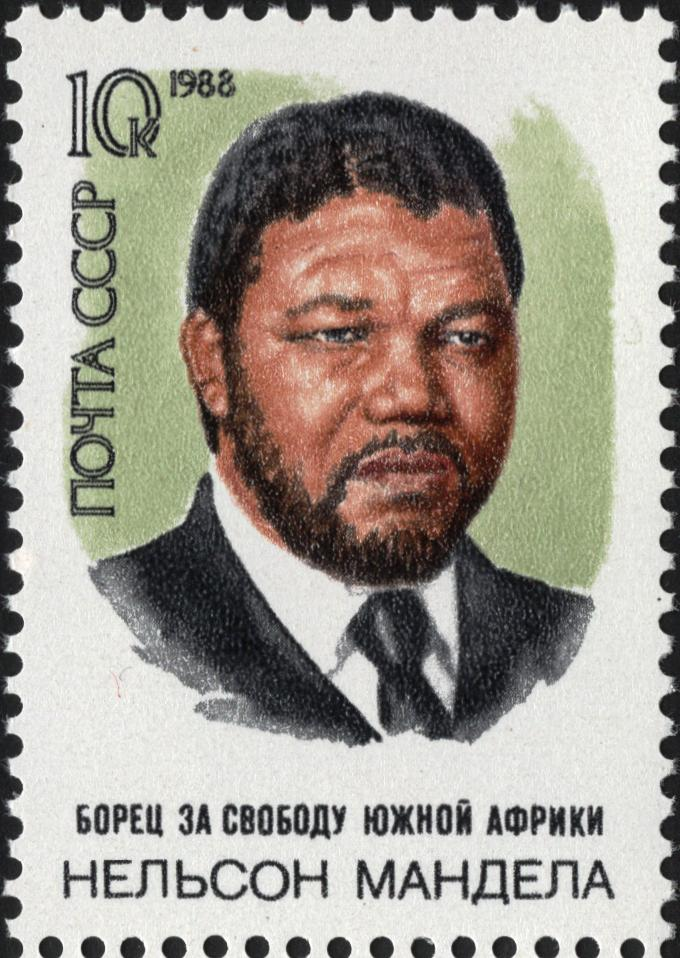
August 5, 1962: Nelson Mandela begins 27 years incarceration

August 6, 1962: Jamaica becomes independent

August 31, 1962: Trinidad & Tobago becomes independent

The following events occurred in August 1962:

== August 1, 1962 (Wednesday) ==
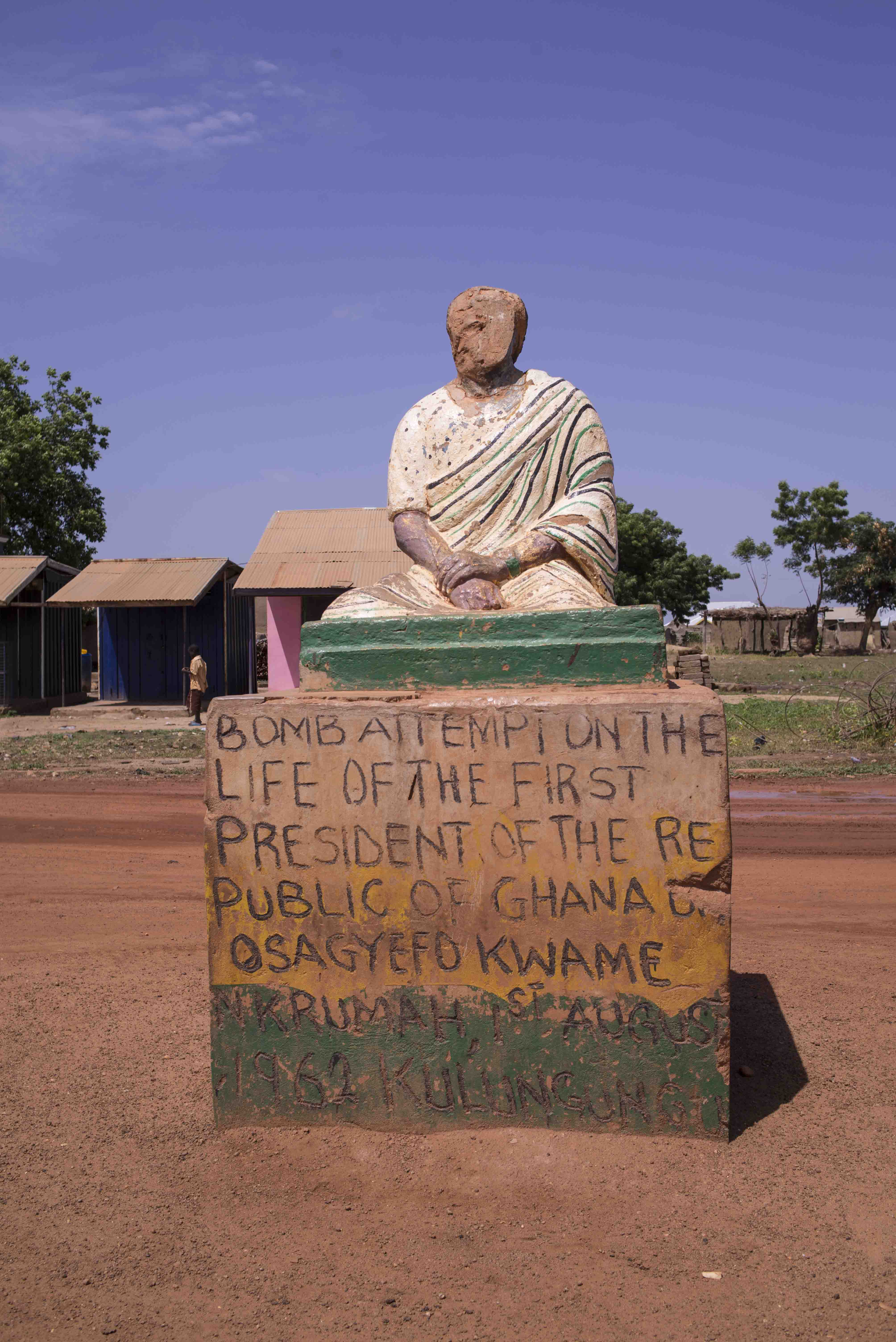
A monument to the Kulungulu attack

- An assassination attempt against Ghana's President Kwame Nkrumah, failed when Nkrumah finished a speech early before a time bomb went off. Nkrumah had stopped in the village of Kulungugu on his way back from a state visit to Upper Volta.
- A Nepal Airlines RNA Douglas C-47A-DL (9N-AAH), en route from Kathmandu-Gaucher Airport to New Delhi, crashed near Tulachan Dhuri. The wreckage was discovered eight days later on a mountain top at 11,200 feet (3,400 m). All four crew and six passengers were killed, including Nepal's ambassador to India. Initial reports were that rescue teams had found the airliner, and that all 10 people on board were safe.
- The Darul Islam rebellion in Indonesia was defeated with the capture of its leader, Sekarmadji Maridjan Kartosuwirjo, who would be executed a month later.
- In Major League Baseball, pitcher Bill Monbouquette, playing for the Boston Red Sox, pitched a no-hitter against the Chicago White Sox, one of five that year after only one had been pitched in 1961. Besides Monbouquette, no-hitters were also pitched in May (by Bo Belinsky of the Angels), two in the final week of June (on June 26 by Monbouquette's Red Sox teammate Earl Wilson and on June 30 by the Dodgers' Sandy Koufax), and a final one on August 26 by Minnesota's Jack Kralick.
- Died:
  - Dr. Geoffrey Bacon, 44, British scientist, died three days after being accidentally infected by bubonic plague at Britain's germ warfare center at Porton Down, Wiltshire.
  - General Gordon Bennett, 75, Australian military leader

== August 2, 1962 (Thursday) ==
- In order to bring an end to the Saskatchewan doctors' strike, a special session of the legislature of Saskatchewan amended the provincial Medical Care Insurance Act that had caused an unprecedented work stoppage by doctors and surgeons, adjourning after completing its work in less than 12 hours.
- North American Aviation began testing its emergency parachute recovery system for Project Gemini's Paraglider Development Program. The first test was successful, but in every test afterward, recovery parachutes separated from the spacecraft immediately after deployment and the test vehicle was destroyed on impact. The test series ended on November 15.
- Cominco Binani Zinc Ltd. was established on the banks of the Periyar River in Kerala, India.
- Born: Brian France, American businessman, CEO of NASCAR, and son of Bill France Jr.; in Daytona Beach, Florida

== August 3, 1962 (Friday) ==
- President John F. Kennedy decided to break ties with singer Frank Sinatra after his brother, U.S. Attorney General Robert F. Kennedy, reported to him about Sinatra's connections with organized crime. Sinatra was reportedly so enraged by the President's decision to no longer visit the singer's Palm Springs home, that he took a sledgehammer and personally destroyed a landing pad built to accommodate visits by the presidential helicopter, Marine One.
- "Tusko", a 14-year-old male Indian elephant at the Oklahoma City Zoo, was injected with 270 milligrams (4.2 gr) of the hallucinogen LSD in an experiment by researchers at the University of Oklahoma to simulate musth, the periodic condition of aggressive behavior and rage by male elephants. Tusko collapsed five minutes after the injection and died less than two hours later.
- The U.S. Air Force outlined its plans for converting Complex 14 at the Atlantic Missile Range at Cape Canaveral for use by the Gemini Project Office. The site of Project Mercury launches, Complex 14 would be modified for Project Gemini operations as the Agena target vehicle launch site.
- Died: Dean Cromwell, 82, American athletics coach, nicknamed "Maker of Champions", who coached the USC Trojans track team to 12 national championships, including nine consecutive titles from 1935 to 1943.

== August 4, 1962 (Saturday) ==
- Marilyn Monroe took a fatal overdose of Nembutal at her home at 12305 Fifth Helena Drive in Brentwood in Los Angeles, apparently at some point between a 7:15 p.m. phone call from her former stepson, Joe DiMaggio Jr. and a 7:30 p.m. call from actor Peter Lawford. The Nembutal interacted with a dosage of chloral hydrate already in her body and she was in a coma by 10 p.m.
- Crown Prince Vong Savang of Laos married Princess Mahneelai.

== August 5, 1962 (Sunday) ==
- Nelson Mandela was arrested in South Africa, and imprisoned for more than 27 years. After returning home from a tour that he had made of African nations, Mandela was being driven by Cecil Williams to Johannesburg. Their car was near the village of Cedara, outside of Howick, when a Sergeant Vorster recognized both men and pulled them over. Mandela, who identified himself as David Motsamayi, was taken to Pietermaritzburg. While serving part of a five-year sentence for illegally leaving the country, he was tried and convicted on new charges in 1963 for sabotage and given a life sentence. He would not be released until February 11, 1990. In 1994, Mandela would be elected the first black President of South Africa.
- The Soviet Union conducted the second largest nuclear test in history, detonating a 40 megaton hydrogen bomb.
- 3C 273, the first identified quasar, was found by Australian astronomer John Bolton with the radio telescope at the Parkes Observatory in New South Wales.
- American Nazi Party leader George Lincoln Rockwell was the guest of honor at a rally of Britain's neo-Nazi party, the National Socialist Movement, led by Colin Jordan. Rockwell had been barred from the UK by order of the Home Office, but sneaked in anyway to be present at the camp in Gloucestershire.
- Graham Hill won the 1962 German Grand Prix at the Nürburgring.
- Born: Patrick Ewing, Jamaican-born American basketball player, 1985 NCAA player of the year and 11-time NBA All-Star; in Kingston

== August 6, 1962 (Monday) ==
- Jamaica received its independence from the United Kingdom. Princess Margaret of the UK and U.S. Vice-President Lyndon B. Johnson were among the dignitaries who watched the lowering of the British flag in Kingston.
- The Friendship 7 spacecraft used in John Glenn's Mercury 6 flight completed its exhibition tour around the world with its display at the Century 21 Exposition in Seattle, Washington. Afterward, Glenn's capsule would be presented to the National Air Museum of the Smithsonian Institution on February 20, 1963.
- Patsy Cline released her final studio album, Sentimentally Yours, seven months before her death in a plane crash.
- Born: Michelle Yeoh, Malaysian actress; in Ipoh
- Died: Ángel Borlenghi, 58, Argentine labour leader and politician, Interior Minister and enforcer for dictator Juan Perón (1946–1955)

== August 7, 1962 (Tuesday) ==
- Guillermo Valencia of the Conservative Party was sworn in as the new President of Colombia, quietly succeeding Alberto Lleras Camargo of the Liberal Party. Valencia's inauguration marked the first successful test of a unique agreement, whereby the Liberal and Conservative agreed to alternate the presidency every four years.
- Algeria's provisional government, led by Prime Minister Benyoucef Benkhedda, stepped aside in favor of leftist Vice-Premier Ahmed Ben Bella, who had returned to Algiers from Oran four days earlier.

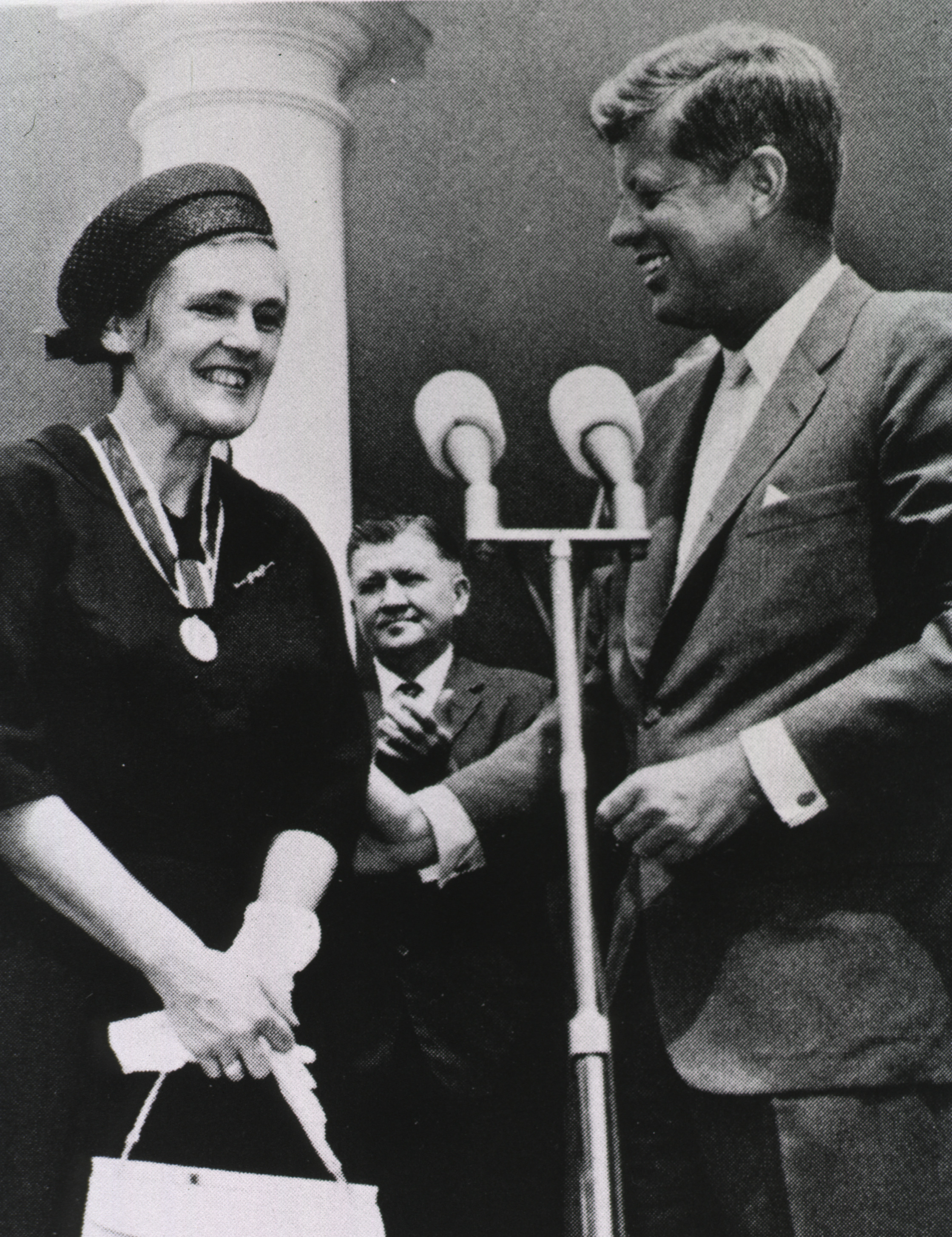
Dr. Kelsey and President Kennedy

- At the White House, President Kennedy presented the President's Award for Distinguished Federal Civilian Service to Dr. Frances Oldham Kelsey, a reviewer for the U.S. Food and Drug Administration who successfully blocked the approval of the birth-defect causing drug thalidomide for American sale.

== August 8, 1962 (Wednesday) ==
- Elizabeth Ann Duncan, 58, became the last woman to be executed in the United States prior to the restoration of the death penalty in 1977. She was put to death in the gas chamber at California's San Quentin State Prison on the same day as the two men whom she had hired to murder her pregnant daughter-in-law. On November 17, 1958, Mrs. Olga Kupczyk Duncan and her unborn daughter had been beaten to death by Augustine Baldonado and Luis Moya, to whom Elizabeth had promised $8,000 which was never paid.
- Atlas launch vehicle 113-D was delivered to Cape Canaveral for the October Mercury 8 mission of Wally Schirra.
- The 3rd Nippon Jamboree came to an end in Gotenba, Shizuoka Prefecture in Japan.
- Born: Charmaine Crooks, Jamaican-born Canadian athlete; in Mandeville
- Died: Don Davis, 28, died of injuries sustained in a sprint car race three days earlier at New Bremen, Ohio. Less than three months earlier, Davis had finished in fourth place in the 1962 Indianapolis 500.

== August 9, 1962 (Thursday) ==
- Prime Minister of Canada John Diefenbaker shuffled his cabinet, giving new jobs to six Ministers and bringing in three new men. Five of his Ministers had lost their seats in Parliament in the June 18 elections. Among the changes were the move of Finance Minister Donald Fleming to Minister of Justice and Attorney General and the removal of William Joseph Browne who left the office of Solicitor General of Canada, a position that would remain vacant for nearly a year.
- Died: Hermann Hesse, 85, German-born Swiss novelist known for such works as Steppenwolf and Siddhartha, and 1946 winner of the Nobel Prize in Literature

== August 10, 1962 (Friday) ==
- CIA Director John McCone provided his first memorandum to U.S. President Kennedy about surveillance that would lead to a U.S. and Soviet confrontation in the Cuban Missile Crisis, describing an increase of Soviet shipments to Cuba, and his speculation that the Soviet Union was placing offensive missiles in the Caribbean island nation. McCone would give the President three more warnings in August.
- The Herbert Hoover Presidential Library was dedicated and opened to the public in West Branch, Iowa. Hoover, who had served as the 31st President of the United States (1929–1933) was present and was celebrating his 88th birthday.
- The Bell 533 research helicopter made its first flight, at Bell's Fort Worth, Texas, headquarters.
- Died:
  - Paul David Devanandan, 61, Indian Protestant Christian theologian
  - Ted Husing, 60, pioneering American sportscaster

== August 11, 1962 (Saturday) ==
- Andriyan Nikolayev became the third Soviet cosmonaut, and the fifth man to orbit the Earth, when the Soviet Union launched Vostok 3 from Baikonur Cosmodrome. Although the Soviets maintained the practice of not announcing the launch until after it had happened, live video of a Soviet cosmonaut in orbit was broadcast for the first time.
- The Mercury spacecraft reaction control system test was completed. Data compiled from this test was used to evaluate the thermal and thruster configuration of the Mercury extended range or 1-day mission spacecraft.
- King Kong vs. Godzilla made its debut in Japan, becoming the 2nd-highest grossing movie in Japanese filmography, earning ¥352 million at the Japanese box office, under a ¥150 million budget.
- Pyotr Bolotnikov of the Soviet Union set the new 10,000 metres world record race in Moscow, completing the distance in 28 minutes, 18.2 seconds. Bolotnikov, broke his own record of 28:18.6.
- Died: Harry Wexler, an American meteorologist who had been researching the link between depletion of stratospheric ozone and aerosol propellants, died of a heart attack while on vacation. Wexler had accepted an invitation to deliver a lecture entitled "The Climate of Earth and Its Modifications" at the University of Maryland Space Research and Technology Institute. Another twelve years would pass before the first papers about the effect of chlorofluorocarbon on the ozone layer were published. "Had Wexler lived to publish his ideas", an author would comment later, "they would certainly have been noticed and could have led to a different outcome and perhaps an earlier coordinated response to the issue of stratospheric ozone depletion."

== August 12, 1962 (Sunday) ==
- The Soviet Union launched Vostok 4 from Baikonur Cosmodrome, with cosmonaut Pavel Popovich on board, marking the first time that two crewed spacecraft were in orbit at the same time. The two Vostok capsules came within 6.5 km (4.0 mi) of one another, and the cosmonauts established ship-to-ship radio contact. Arthur C. Clarke would write later that the double launch "stunned the world", because the Soviet Union accomplishment "required synchronization of Herculean proportions at the launch site", with the second launch "at exactly the right moment to ensure the near-perfect rendezvous... only their fourth manned space flight," something well beyond the American space program at the time.

== August 13, 1962 (Monday) ==
- On the first anniversary of the creation of the Berlin Wall, three minutes of silence were supposed to be observed at noon in West Berlin. Instead, angry crowds began hurling stones across the border at police in East Berlin, who responded by firing a water cannon across the Wall and into the crowd. After more stones were thrown by the Western protesters, tear gas grenades were fired from East Berlin, after which West Berlin riot police sent their own tear gas across the border. The clash ended after an hour, and there were no serious injuries.
- Renato Daguin and Giovanni Ottin made the first complete ascent of the west face of the Matterhorn. This was the last face to have been completely ascended.
- Jean Marie Bertrand became Administrator Superior of Wallis and Futuna, a colony of France.
- Died: Mabel Dodge Luhan, 83, American patron of the arts

== August 14, 1962 (Tuesday) ==
- For only the fifth time in its history, and for the first time in 35 years, the U.S. Senate invoked cloture, the ending of a filibuster against the Communications Satellite Act of 1962. The vote was 63–27 in favor of ending debate, three more than the two-thirds necessary. When it came up for a vote, the bill, establishing COMSAT, passed the Senate 66–11 and the House 371–10. President Kennedy would sign it into law on August 31.
- Robbers armed with submachine guns held up a U.S. Mail truck near Plymouth, Massachusetts, and heisted its $1,500,000 cargo that had been en route to the Federal Reserve Bank in Boston. A man dressed as a police officer flagged the truck down, and two cars pulled out from side roads. The caper was financed by mobster Gennaro "Jerry" Angiulo and carried out under the direction of John "Red" Kelley. Kelley would later arrange for the murder of six of the participants in the plot, would avoid prison by becoming a witness against his fellow criminals, and, after being relocated by the federal witness protection program, would eventually die of natural causes.
- North American began flight tests for the half-scale text vehicle (HSTV) for the Paraglider Development Program, towing it aloft by helicopter. Despite various minor malfunctions in all five test flights from August 14 to October 23, test results verified the stability of the wing/vehicle combination in free flight and the adequacy of control effectiveness.
- Born: Ikililou Dhoinine, President of the Comoros from 2011 to 2016; in Djoièzi
- Died: Rudi Arnstadt, 35, East German border guard captain, was shot by Hans Plüschke, a 23-year-old West German border guard. Plüschke claimed to be returning fire after his patrol was shot at.

== August 15, 1962 (Wednesday) ==
- Representatives of the Netherlands and Indonesia signed the New York Agreement, with the Netherlands transferring administration of the Western New Guinea colony to the United Nations Trusteeship Council until May 1, 1963, after which the U.N. Temporary Executive Authority (UNTEA) and Indonesia would jointly administer the territory for a period of six years, during which the Western New Guineans were to be given a choice as to their future. In 1969, the territory would be incorporated into Indonesia.
- PFC James Joseph Dresnok of the United States Army decided to defect to North Korea while stationed on the south side of the Korean Demilitarized Zone. Fifty years later, he was the only surviving American defector remaining in North Korea.
- Vostok 3 landed at 06:52 UTC at 42°2′N 75°45′E, near Karaganda. Cosmonaut Andrian Nikolayev ejected the spacecraft during its descent and parachuted to earth, having set a new record of 64 orbits during nearly four days in space.
- The Australian Air Force's "Red Sales" aerobatic stunt flying team was wiped out when all four of its Vampire jets crashed, killing the six airmen aboard, during formation flying near the East Sale Air Force Base.
- South Africa legalized the sale of beer, wine and liquor to Africans and Asians for the first time. Previously, the privilege had been limited to White people only.

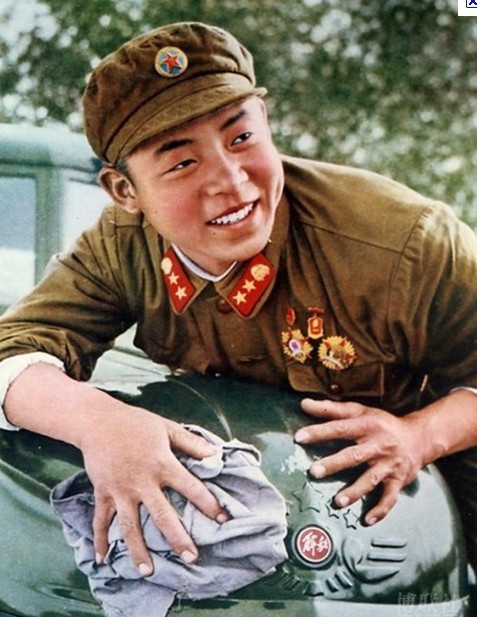
Feng

- Died: Lei Feng, 21, who had in 1957 been named as a "model worker" by the People's Republic of China for good citizens to emulate, and in 1960, a "model soldier" of the People's Liberation Army, died "after being accidentally killed by a falling telephone pole that had been run into by a truck". He would become even more famous on March 5, 1963, when China Youth Daily would begin the "Learn from Lei Feng" campaign (Xiang Lei Feng tongzhi xuexi).

== August 16, 1962 (Thursday) ==
- The four former colonies of French India were formally transferred to Indian control with the exchange of the instruments of ratification by the French parliament of the 1954 transfer agreement. The four French territories (Pondicherry, Karaikal, Yanam and Mahé) would be merged to form the Union Territory of Puducherry.
- Beatles drummer Pete Best was fired and replaced by Ringo Starr.
- The Gemini Project Office (GPO) approved eight of the Agena status displays for the Gemini spacecraft. The GPO also approved a list of 34 commands required to control certain Agena functions during rendezvous and docking maneuvers by the Gemini spacecraft.
- The U.S. Air Force and NASA agreed to use a standard Atlas space booster for the Gemini program, with the first rocket expected to be available by September 1963.
- Born: Steve Carell, American comedian and TV and film actor known for The Office and The 40-Year-Old Virgin; in Concord, Massachusetts
- Died: Phillip Kastel, 69, American gangster

== August 17, 1962 (Friday) ==
- Peter Fechter, aged 18, was killed by East German border guards as he attempted to cross the Berlin Wall into West Berlin. Fechter's death has been described as "the most notorious incident of all" in the 27-year history of the Wall, because Fechter slowly bled to death from his bullet wounds, in front of newspaper photographers and hundreds of spectators who were unable to assist him, and East German guards who refused to approach him until he died an hour later. In 1996, indictments would be returned against the two former guards, Rolf Friedrich and Erich Schreiber, who had shot Fechter. They would be convicted of manslaughter on March 5, 1997, and placed on probation.
- Television was first broadcast in Indonesia, at the time a nation of 97,000,000 people, as Jakarta station TVRI (Televisi Republik Indonesia) or The National Television Channel of Indonesia, began test broadcasting on Channel 5, coming directly from the Presidential Palace on the Indonesian independence day. Regular broadcasting began on August 24, with transmission of the Asian Games.
- Foy D. Kohler was confirmed by the U.S. Senate to be the new United States ambassador to the Soviet Union.

== August 18, 1962 (Saturday) ==
- Denied the right to an abortion in her home state of Arizona and anywhere else in the United States, Sherri Finkbine received the procedure in Stockholm. Mrs. Finkbine, host of a children's TV show in Phoenix, had been seeking to terminate her pregnancy since late July after learning that a medicine she had taken was thalidomide, which was found to cause severe birth defects, and her search for a legal abortion began the first nationwide debate in the U.S. over whether abortion should be legal.
- An experiment in publishing a "worldwide newspaper" by satellite was conducted from New York City, as seven newspaper pages were photographed, reduced in size, transmitted to the orbiting Telstar satellite, and then received at ground stations on various continents.
- Norway launched its first sounding rocket, Ferdinand 1, from Andøya Space Center to begin its space program.
- A group of 17 children from the Blessed Hope Missionary Baptist Church of Quincy, Florida drowned along with their Sunday school teacher when their boat capsized in Lake Talquin. The children, seven of whom were from the same family, ranged in age from 5 to 14 years old.
- Drummer Ringo Starr made his first appearance as a full member of the Beatles, at a Horticultural Society dance at Port Sunlight.
- Born: Felipe Calderón, 63rd President of Mexico from 2006 to 2012; in Morelia, Michoacán state

== August 19, 1962 (Sunday) ==
- The Central Committee of the Communist Party of Hungary (officially, the Hungarian Socialist Workers' Party) purged 24 former politicians, including former General Secretary Mátyás Rákosi and his successor, Ernő Gerő, as well as Politburo member Károly Kiss, in a move to rid the Party of Stalinists.
- Italian driver Lorenzo Bandini won the first Mediterranean Grand Prix, held at the Autodromo di Pergusa, Sicily.

== August 20, 1962 (Monday) ==
- The U.S. Department of Defense announced plans to develop a Titan III launch vehicle powered by both solid and liquid fuel rocket motors with a total thrust of over 11 million newtons (2.5 million lbs). Scheduled to become operational in 1965, the Titan III would be used to launch the Air Force's X-20 Dyna-Soar crewed spacecraft, as well as heavy uncrewed military satellites. Martin Marietta Corporation had been selected as prime contractor for the project, at an estimated cost of between $500 million and $1 billion. At a news conference the following day, U.S. Defense Secretary Robert S. McNamara cited the Titan III as a major step toward overtaking the Soviet Union in various phases of military space development.
- Fifteen people were killed in the crash of a Panair do Brasil DC-8 airliner, after it skidded off the runway while attempting to take off from Rio de Janeiro to Lisbon. Another 90 were rescued, or escaped, from the flaming airliner.

== August 21, 1962 (Tuesday) ==
- The source of what would be developed into the anti-cancer drug taxol (paclitaxel) was discovered by a team of botanists, led by Dr. Arthur Barclay, who collected bark from a specific type of Pacific yew tree, Taxus brevifolia Nutt, in the Gifford Pinchot National Forest. Taxol, developed from the extract of the bark, is now used in treatment of ovarian and breast cancer.
- The Mexican soccer football team C.D. Guadalajara won the 1962 CONCACAF Champions' Cup, defeating the Guatemalan team C.S.D. Comunicaciones by a 6–1 aggregate over two games.
- Born: David Morales, American musician and 1998 Grammy Award winner; in Brooklyn
- Died:
  - Hermann Höfle, 51, Nazi war criminal, hanged himself in prison in Austria, where he had been incarcerated since January 1961. He was awaiting trial for war crimes during World War II.
  - Richard Garrick, 83, Irish-born American film actor and director

== August 22, 1962 (Wednesday) ==
- Petit-Clamart attack: An assassination attempt against French President Charles De Gaulle failed, as he, his wife, and son-in-law were near Petit Clamart, being driven in his Citroën DS from Paris to the Villacoublay Airfield. A team of 12 OAS gunmen, led by former French Air Force Lieutenant Colonel. Jean Bastien-Thiry, attacked the limousine. The rear window and two tires of De Gaulle's car were shot out, and the President was struck by shattered glass, as ambushers fired more than 120 bullets at the automobile, but miraculously, nobody was injured. Bastien-Thiry was arrested on September 17, and executed by firing squad on March 11, 1963.

== August 23, 1962 (Thursday) ==
- Soviet writer Valery Tarsis was punished for his anti-government novel, The Bluebottle Fly. He was forcibly committed to the Kashchenko Psychiatric Hospital with a diagnosis of "expansive paranoia". He would not be released for six months, and would later describe the experience in his novel Ward 7.
- The National Reconnaissance Office of the United States made its first successful launch of a weather satellite intended to determine cloud cover in advance of a pass by spy satellites and spy planes.
- John Lennon secretly married Cynthia Powell at Mount Pleasant Register office in Liverpool. Lennon's fellow Beatles, Paul McCartney and George Harrison, attended the ceremony, and their manager Brian Epstein served as Lennon's best man.
- Mohammad Ichsan and Abdul Wahab Surjoadiningrat were appointed to the Third Working Cabinet of President Sukarno in Indonesia.
- Died: Hoot Gibson, 70, American western actor

== August 24, 1962 (Friday) ==
- In the most dramatic attack on Cuba since the Bay of Pigs Invasion the year before, a suburb of Havana was shelled from speedboats operated by the Cuban exile terrorist group Directorio Estudiantile. Operating from a 31-foot (9.4 m) boat, the attackers, led by Manuel Salvat, fired 60 artillery shells at buildings in Miramar, an upscale section of the Havana suburb of Playa. Nine rooms of the Icar Hostel, formerly the Hotel Rosita de Hornedo, were damaged, and 20 people were injured. The boat departed after seven minutes.
- TVRI or Televisi Republik Indonesia (Indonesian National Television Channel), the first national television network of Indonesia, made its official debut with a broadcast of the opening of the 1962 Asian Games in Jakarta.
- Born: Craig Kilborn, American television host, actor, comedian, and sports commentator; in Kansas City, Missouri

== August 25, 1962 (Saturday) ==
- Venera 2MV-1 No.1, also called Sputnik 19, was launched from the Baikonur Cosmodrome, with the aim of being the first craft to land on the planet Venus. However, the probe never succeeded in leaving low Earth orbit and re-entered the atmosphere three days later. At the time, Soviet policy was to never announce a space mission until after it was launched, and to never announce a failed launch.
- Born:
  - Rajiv Kapoor, Indian actor and film-maker, son of Raj Kapoor; in Mumbai (died from a heart attack, 2021)
  - Taslima Nasrin, Bangladeshi doctor, author and human rights activist; in Mymensingh

== August 26, 1962 (Sunday) ==
- The last major event of baseball's Negro American League was played, as the annual East-West All-Star Game took place at Municipal Stadium in Kansas City, Missouri. In the final season of the NAL, there were only four teams. The defending NAL champions, the Kansas City Monarchs, along with members of the Birmingham Black Barons, paced the West team in a 5–2 win.
- The Soviet national newspaper Pravda denounced the European Economic Community (known then as the "Common Market"), as "an imperialist agency intensifying aggressive activity against the Communist nations".
- The 1962 Danish Grand Prix was won by Jack Brabham.
- Died:
  - Edward Turnour, 6th Earl Winterton, 79, English politician who served as a member of the House of Commons from 1904 until his retirement in 1951; during his last six years, he was the "Father of the House" as the longest serving MP in the United Kingdom.
  - Vilhjalmur Stefansson, 82, Canadian Arctic explorer and ethnologist

== August 27, 1962 (Monday) ==
- The proposed Twenty-fourth Amendment to the United States Constitution, outlawing the poll tax, was submitted to the states for ratification. The House of Representatives voted 295–86 to approve the resolution, which had passed the U.S. Senate 77–16 on March 27. By 1962, only two American states (Alabama and Mississippi) still used the poll tax to deter African-Americans from voting, and only three others (Arkansas, Texas and Virginia) had a poll tax law. The Amendment would be ratified on January 23, 1964, when South Dakota would become the 38th of 50 states to approve it.

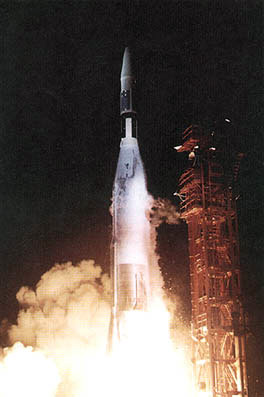
August 27, 1962: U.S. launches Mariner 2 to Venus

- NASA launched the Mariner 2 space probe toward the planet Venus, The probe lifted off from Cape Canaveral at 1:58 a.m. (658 UTC) local time. As the first successful mission to another planet, Mariner 2 would reach Venus on December 14, 1962, gathering data for 42 minutes and approaching within 21,600 miles (34,752 km). The launch came a month after the failed American launch of Mariner 1 to Venus, and three days after the Soviet launch of Sputnik 19 to Venus.
- At a meeting in Guangzhou between China's Prime Minister Zhou Enlai and North Vietnam's Prime Minister Pham Van Dong, the People's Republic committed to supplying the Viet Cong, at China's expense, "with enough weapons to arm 230 infantry battalions".
- Born: Sjón (Sigurjón Birgir Sigurðsson), Icelandic novelist, poet and lyricist; in Reykjavík

== August 28, 1962 (Tuesday) ==
- The Gemini Project Office and McDonnell revised the projected launch date of the Gemini 1, the first Gemini flight from August 1963 to September 1963, because of delays in the delivery of components. The second Gemini mission (Gemini 2) and the first human flight (Gemini 3, with Gus Grissom and John Young) remained scheduled for November 1963. Ultimately, Gemini 1 would be launched in April 1964, Gemini 2 in January 1965 and Gemini 3 in March 1965.
- Felix Frankfurter, one of the nine justices of the United States Supreme Court since 1939, sent U.S. President Kennedy his letter of resignation, citing health problems. U.S. Secretary of Labor Arthur J. Goldberg was nominated to replace Frankfurter.
- Born:
  - David Zuckerman, American TV producer and writer; in Danville, California
  - David Fincher, American film director; in Denver, Colorado
- Died: Edmond Privat, 73, Swiss Esperantist, historian, academic, journalist and peace activist

== August 29, 1962 (Wednesday) ==
- Photographs by an American U-2 spy plane over Cuba first revealed the presence there of Soviet SA-2 missiles, for anti-aircraft defense. Offensive, nuclear-armed missiles would not be discovered in Cuba until later flights, precipitating the Cuban Missile Crisis.
- FC Nuremberg defeated Fortuna Düsseldorf, 2–1, in the final of the 1961–62 DFB-Pokal, the postseason tournament of the 16 highest finishing West German clubs.

== August 30, 1962 (Thursday) ==
- An American U-2 spyplane, flying from Japan, accidentally drifted over the Soviet Union's Sakhalin Island, the only known incursion after the 1960 U-2 incident. The U.S. State Department formally apologized to the Soviet Union following a protest.
- Born: Alexander Litvinenko, Russian defector who was murdered by polonium-210 radiation poisoning in 2006 after publishing two books critical of the regime of Vladimir Putin; in Voronezh
- Died:
  - Al Tomaini, 50, retired American circus performer billed as "The Tallest Man in the World" (verified as being 8 feet 4.5 inches (2.553 m) tall in 1931); in Gibsonton, Florida, of complications after the removal of a pituitary gland tumor a few weeks earlier.
  - Aaslaug Aasland, 72, Norwegian Social Affairs Minister from 1948 to 1953

== August 31, 1962 (Friday) ==
- Trinidad and Tobago, consisting of the two southernmost islands of the West Indies, became independent after 165 years as a British colony. As midnight approached in Port of Spain on August 30, the British flag was slowly lowered as the Royal Marine Band played Taps, and after a moment of silence, the new nation's red, white and black flag was quickly run up the flagpole as the National Guard and police bands played the new national anthem, Forged from the Love of Liberty. Eric Williams served as the nation's first Prime Minister, while former governor Solomon Hochoy became Governor-General.
- Gemini Project Office outlined plans for checking out the Gemini spacecraft units, Cape Canaveral, including the enlargement of the Hangar S complex at Cape Canaveral, and housing major test stations at the adjacent Hangar AR, an existing facility adjacent to Hangar S. The required facilities were set for completion by March 1, 1963, in time for the checkout of Gemini spacecraft No. 1, scheduled to arrive by the end of April 1963.
