= H. H. Cofie-Crabbe =

Ghanaian politician

Hugh Horatio Cofie-Crabbe

Executive Secretary of the Convention People's Party
- In office 1 May 1961 – 29 August 1962
- Leader: Kwame Nkrumah
- Preceded by: New position
- Succeeded by: Nathaniel Welbeck

Personal details
- Born: Ghana
- Education: Accra Academy
- Profession: Councillor, Politician

Hugh Horatio Cofie-Crabbe was a Ghanaian politician who is notable as being detained with two cabinet ministers for the Kulungugu bomb attempt on the life of Ghana's political leader Kwame Nkrumah in 1962. At the time of being detained, he was the executive secretary of Nkrumah's Convention People's Party and a widely known party functionary.

== Early life ==
H. H. Cofie-Crabbe was a foundation student of Accra Academy. He had his secondary education there from 1931 to 1936.

== Career ==
Cofie-Crabbe was a member of the Accra Municipal Council. In April 1957, he lost his position on the council when it was suspended by the central government. He worked also as a sales assistant to a local trader.

Cofie-Crabbe became the Senior District Commissioner of Accra before being employed as administrative secretary at the Convention's People's Party headquarters. He was appointed executive secretary of the Convention People's Party on 1 May 1961, the same day Nkrumah assumed office as the general secretary of the party. As executive secretary of the CPP, he enjoyed the status of a minister. He accompanied Nkrumah on foreign trips.

Cofie-Crabbe also served on the first school board of the Nungua Secondary School (now Nungua Senior High School) from 1960 to 1962.

== Kulungugu Trial ==
On 29 August 1962, he was placed in police detention together with two government ministers Tawia Adamafio and Ako Adjei and dismissed from his post at the CPP headquarters. He was charged in connection to the grenade attack on Kwame Nkrumah, the then president of Ghana in Kulungugu. He was trialed before a judge panel presided on by the chief justice Arku Korsah. His lawyers at the trial were Bernard da Rocha and Edward Moore. He was testified against by the party treasurer, A. Y. K. Djin. He was found not guilty by the judges but the decision of the judges were dissatisfying to Nkrumah who had him returned to detention cells with the removal of the judges. A new panel was reconstituted to hear the case and he was sentenced as guilty with a death sentence.

In February 1965, Nkrumah commuted the sentence of the three accused for the bomb attempt to a 20-year prison term. On 13 May 1966, his 20 years sentence was voided by an NLC decree signed by General Joseph Ankrah.
