= September 1962 =

Month of 1962

<<	September 1962					>>
Su	Mo	Tu	We	Th	Fr	Sa
						1
2	3	4	5	6	7	8
9	10	11	12	13	14	15
16	17	18	19	20	21	22
23	24	25	26	27	28	29
30

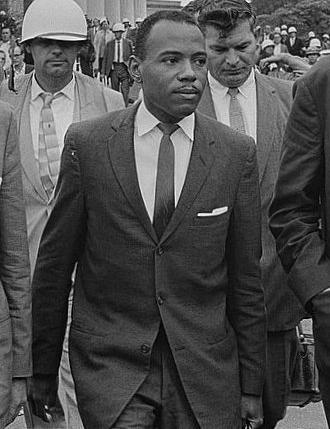
September 30, 1962: James Meredith escorted to the all-white University of Mississippi

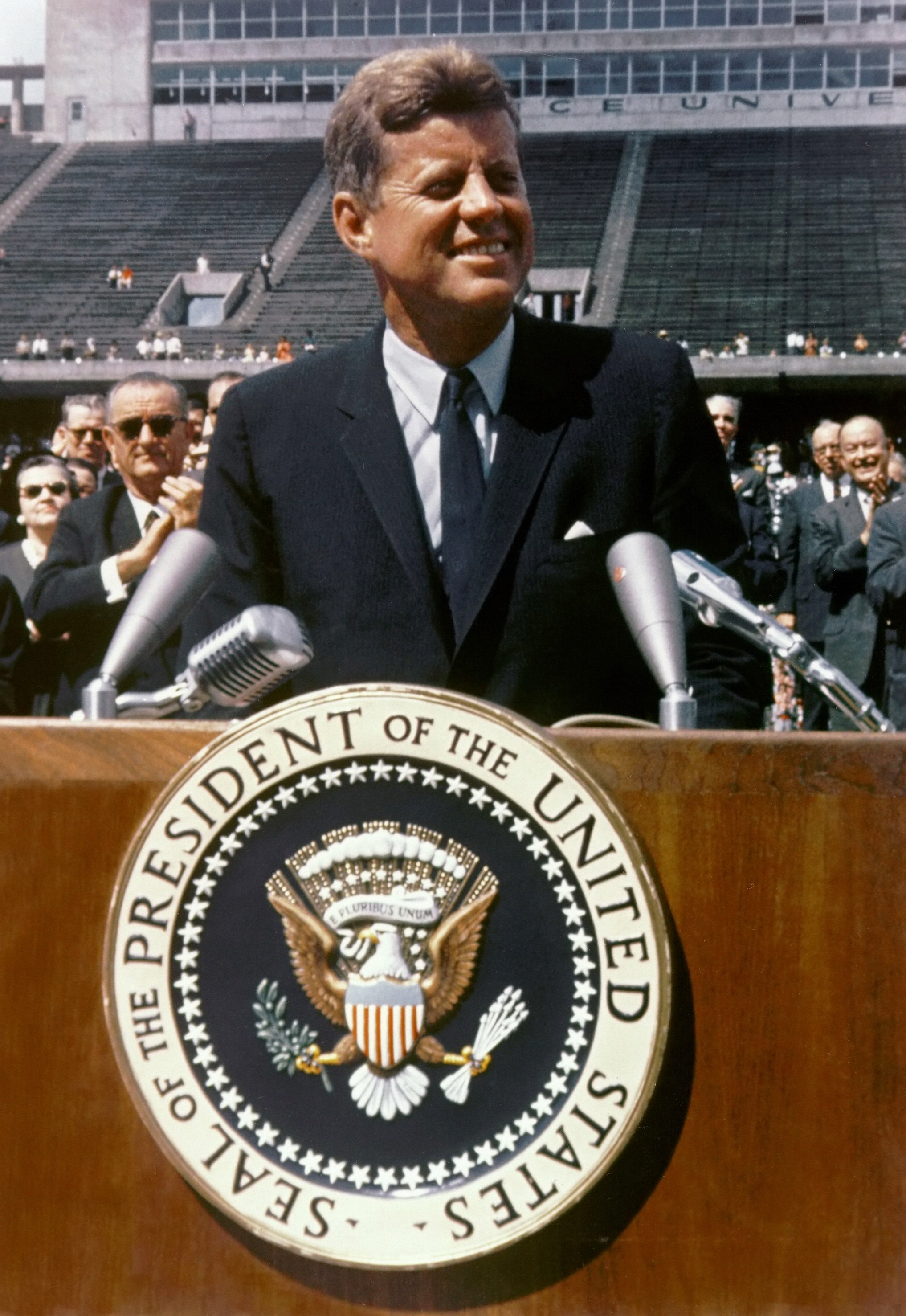
September 12, 1962: U.S. President Kennedy speaks at Houston, pledges to land a man on the Moon by end of decade

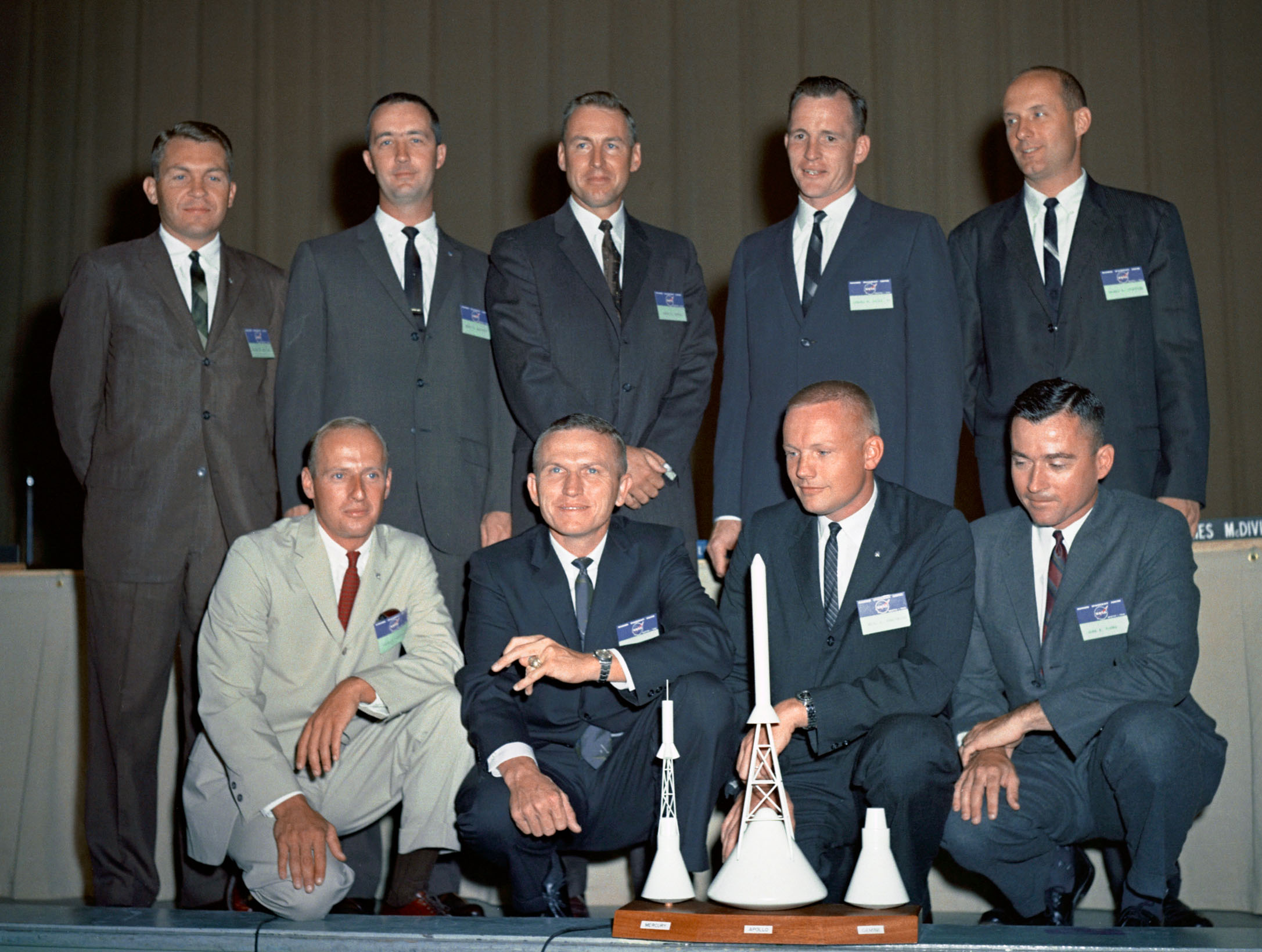
September 17, 1962: The next group of American astronauts introduced

The following events occurred in September 1962:

== September 1, 1962 (Saturday) ==
- A 7.1 magnitude earthquake killed 12,225 people and destroyed 91 villages in northwest Iran. The epicenter was near Buin Zahra in the Qazvin Province.
- In a referendum in Singapore, voters overwhelmingly supported a proposition to merge with the Malayan Federation to become part of Malaysia, with limited autonomy. Out of 561,559 ballots cast, there were 397,626 in favor of making all Singapore residents Malaysian citizens, while allowing independence in matters of labor and education. Another 144,077 ballots were left blank as a protest.
- Typhoon Wanda killed 134 people and injured more than 200 after striking Hong Kong.
- Died: Hans-Jürgen von Arnim, 73, former German military leader

== September 2, 1962 (Sunday) ==
- The Soviet Union announced an agreement on military and industrial assistance to Cuba, following an August meeting in Yalta between Soviet premier Nikita Khrushchev and Cuban Economics Minister Che Guevara.
- The United Kingdom approved the Malta Independence Act, providing that the British colony would become its own nation on September 21, 1964.
- All non-military air travel in the United States and Canada was grounded for five hours as part of "Exercise Sky Shield III".
- Born:
  - Keir Starmer, British politician and barrister serving as Prime Minister of the United Kingdom since 2024; in London
  - Prachya Pinkaew, Thai film director, producer and screenwriter; in Nakhon Ratchasima Province
- Died: William R. Blair, 89, Irish-born American physicist and inventor, most famous for the 1937 creation of the "Object Locating System" better known as radar. He was not allowed to apply for a patent until after World War II and was granted U.S. Patent No. 2,803,819 five years before his death.

== September 3, 1962 (Monday) ==
- Jens Otto Krag succeeded the ailing Viggo Kampmann as Prime Minister of Denmark.
- Wally Gator debuted in syndication as one of the segments of the 1962–63 block The Hanna-Barbera New Cartoon Series. The other two segments that composed the series were Lippy the Lion and Hardy Har Har, and Touché Turtle and Dum Dum.
- Died:
  - E. E. Cummings, 67, American poet and author, died after a cerebral hemorrhage the night before. Edward Elstin Cummings had written his last words the afternoon before, about delphinium flowers, chopped some wood, sharpened the axe, then collapsed in his home.
  - Franz Schrönghamer-Heimdal, 81, German Catholic, Nazi, and anti-Semitic author

== September 4, 1962 (Tuesday) ==
- The closing ceremony of the 1962 Asian Games was held in Jakarta, Indonesia, following an attack on India's embassy by 1,000 rioters. Earlier, Asian Games Federation Vice-President G. D. Sondhi had announced that he was seeking to have the executive council declare that the competition was not part of the name "Asian Games", because AGF members Israel and Nationalist China (Taiwan) had had their teams excluded.
- NASA requested that McDonnell Aircraft Corporation provide Gemini spacecraft No. 3 with space rendezvous radar capability and a rendezvous evaluation pod for Gemini's missions 2 and 3. One prototype, two pods to be used in flight, and one flight spare were asked for.
- The Beatles made their first recording of a song that would become a hit single, "Love Me Do". It would become their fourth #1 song in the United States, in 1964.
- Born:
  - Patrice Lagisquet, French rugby union player with 46 caps for the France national rugby union team; in Arcachon, Gironde département
  - Ulla Tørnæs, Danish Minister of Education (2001–2005), and Minister for Development Cooperation (2016–2019); in Esbjerg

== September 5, 1962 (Wednesday) ==
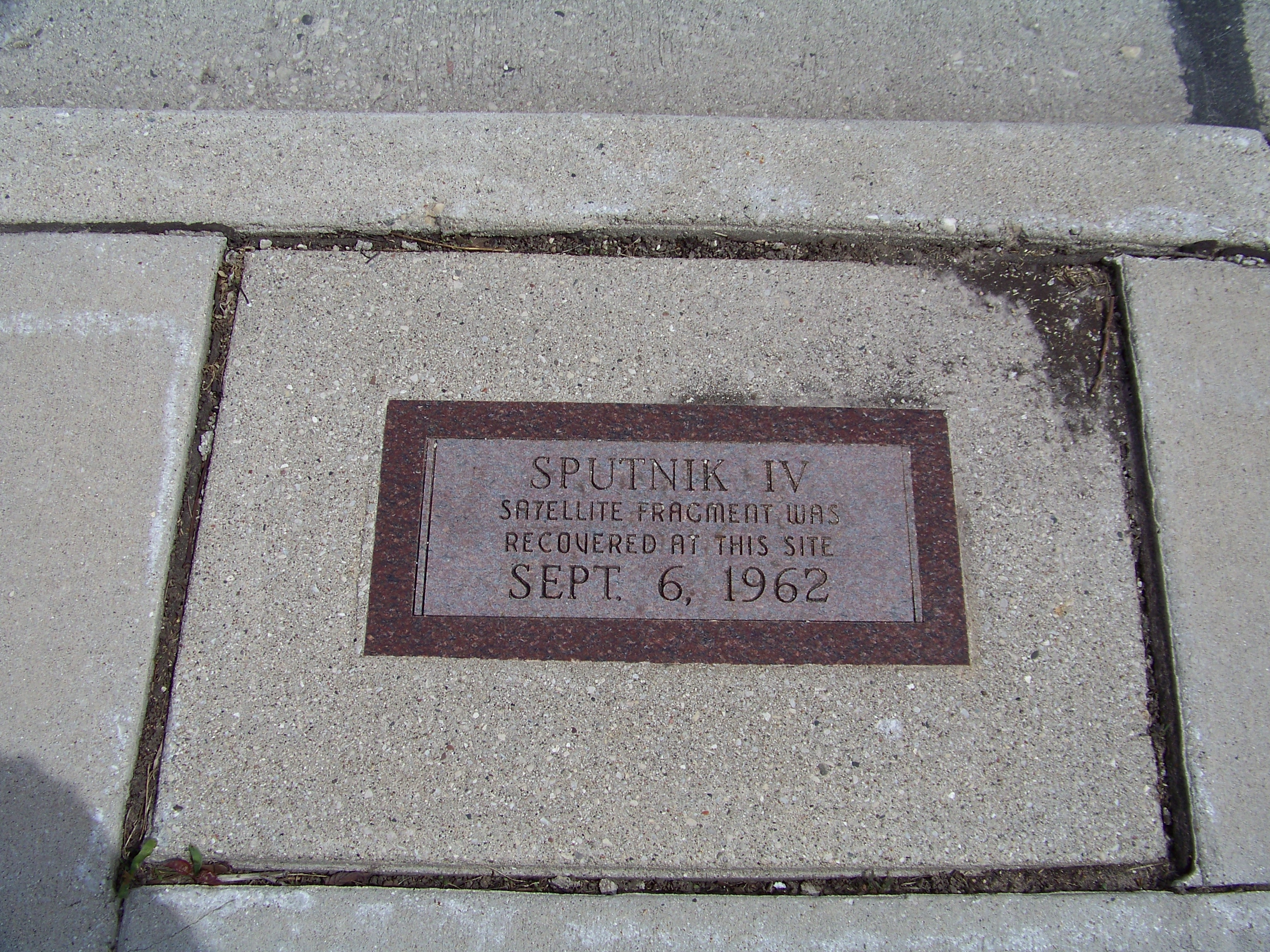
Plaque in Manitowoc marking the impact site

- Sputnik 4, a Soviet mockup of a crewed spacecraft, fell out of orbit after 843 days, having been launched on May 15, 1960. What was believed to be a 20-pound (9.1 kg) fragment landed at the intersection of North 8th Street and Park Street in Manitowoc, Wisconsin, which was along the path where the craft disintegration took place.
- The composition of the American penny was changed to 95% copper and 5% zinc, which remained until 1982, when pennies became 97.5% zinc and 2.5% copper.
- The U.S. National Park Service acquired "Cedar Hill", the home of Frederick Douglass, located at 1411 W Street S.E. in Washington, D.C., which became "the first black national historic site". On the same date, the Park Service acquired "Glenmont", the home (and laboratory) of Thomas Edison in West Orange, New Jersey.
- Died: Sekarmadji Maridjan Kartosuwirjo, 57, Indonesian Islamic mystic and leader of the Darul Islam rebellion against the Sukarno regime, was executed by a firing squad.

== September 6, 1962 (Thursday) ==
- Archaeologist Peter Marsden discovered the first of the "Blackfriars Ships" in London, buried in the mud of the Thames River and literally "under the shadow of Blackfriars Bridge". With a cofferdam to hold back the waters during low tide, and assistance from the London Fire Brigade, the oak craft was excavated. From pottery shards in the wreckage, Marsden estimated that the ship sank during the 2nd century AD, when the Roman Empire ruled Britain.
- McDonnell Aircraft completed redesign and testing of the Gemini capsule ejection seat.

== September 7, 1962 (Friday) ==
- The world's first aquanaut, Robert Sténuit of Belgium, was brought back from the bottom of the Mediterranean Sea, where he had become the first person to spend 24 hours on the ocean floor. Sténuit, who was lowered off the coast of France near Cap Ferrat, stayed inside a pressurized airtight cylinder designed by Edwin Link. Scheduled to remain below for two days in a 3.5-metre (11 ft) long cylinder, Sténuit was brought up early, after one day instead, but became the first living person to stay at least 24 hours in an underwater habitat on the ocean floor.
- Results were announced of a joint study by the U.S. Atomic Energy Commission, the U.S. Department of Defense, and NASA of possible harmful effects of radiation on Mercury 8 and astronaut Wally Schirra. An artificial radiation belt had been created by Operation Dominic, a series of 26 atmospheric nuclear explosions from April through July. The study predicted that radiation outside Schirra's capsule during the six-orbit flight would be about 500 roentgens, but that shielding, vehicle structures, and the flight suit would reduce this exposure to about 8 roentgens on the astronaut's skin, well below the tolerance limits previously established.
- Former French Prime Minister Georges Bidault, who had fled from France to Italy after being indicted for anti-government activities, was taken into custody at Rome and ordered to leave Italy, with transportation "to the frontier of his choice".
- Filming of Sergei Bondarchuk's War and Peace began and would continue for another six years.
- Died:
  - Karen Blixen, 77, Danish author known by her pen name of Isak Dinesen. As Dinesen, she wrote the memoir Out of Africa in 1937, which would become the basis for the 1985 film of the same name.
  - Morris Louis, 49, American painter, died of lung cancer from prolonged exposure to toxic paint fumes.

== September 8, 1962 (Saturday) ==
- The Cuban Missile Crisis began as the first consignment of Soviet R-12 (called SS-4 by NATO) offensive missiles arrived in Cuba, on board the freighter Omsk. The medium range ballistic missiles, which could be fitted with nuclear warheads, could strike targets in the U.S. within 2,000 km or 1,300 miles of Cuba.
- In the Sino-Indian War, two companies of Communist Chinese troops crossed the McMahon Line that had marked the border between India and China, to confront soldiers at the recently established Indian Army border post at Dhola.
- Atlas rocket No. 113-D for Schirra's Mercury 8 flight was static-fired at Cape Canaveral to check modifications made to the booster for smoother engine combustion.

== September 9, 1962 (Sunday) ==
- Pravda, the Soviet Communist Party newspaper, published the article "Plans, Profits, and Bonuses", by economics professor Evsei Liberman of the Kharkiv National University of Economics, as the Communist Party introduced discussion of new policies that would become a reality in the 1965 Soviet economic reform. Liberman's proposal was to depart from the Communist system, of measuring factory efficiency by whether a pre-set production quota had been met, and judging performance instead by the amount of the factories' profit, with the goal of increasing the quality and quantity of products.
- For the first time since Taiwan began U-2 overflights over Mainland China in January, one of the pilots of the Black Cat Squadron, the 35th Reconnaissance Squadron of the Republic of China Air Force, was shot down. Colonel Chen Huai-seng's U-2 plane was struck by an SA-2 Guideline missile near Nanchang, and Colonel Chen did not survive the crash. Another of the Black Cats, Major Wang Cheng-wen, was killed on the same day in an unrelated accidental crash of his U-2 plane.
- Jack Nicklaus won the first "World Series of Golf", a made-for-television exhibition organized by the NBC television network as a competition between the champions of the four major professional golf tournaments. With a 138 on 36 holes, Nicklaus (winner of the U.S. Open) won the $50,000 first prize by finishing four strokes ahead of ahead of Masters and British Open champion Arnold Palmer and PGA Championship winner Gary Player, who tied at 139.
- While India's Prime Minister Jawaharlal Nehru was out of the country for the Commonwealth Prime Ministers' Conference in London, Defence Minister V. K. Krishna Menon gave the order for the Indian Army to "evict" Chinese troops from south of the McMahon Line, even though there were Indian troops north of the line in China. The decision proved to be a disaster.
- Born:
  - Jack Trudeau, American football player and radio announcer; in Forest Lake, Minnesota
  - Liza Marklund, Swedish journalist and crime writer; in Pålmark
- Died: Paavo Aaltonen, 42, Finnish gymnast and a winner of three gold medals in the 1948 Olympics

== September 10, 1962 (Monday) ==
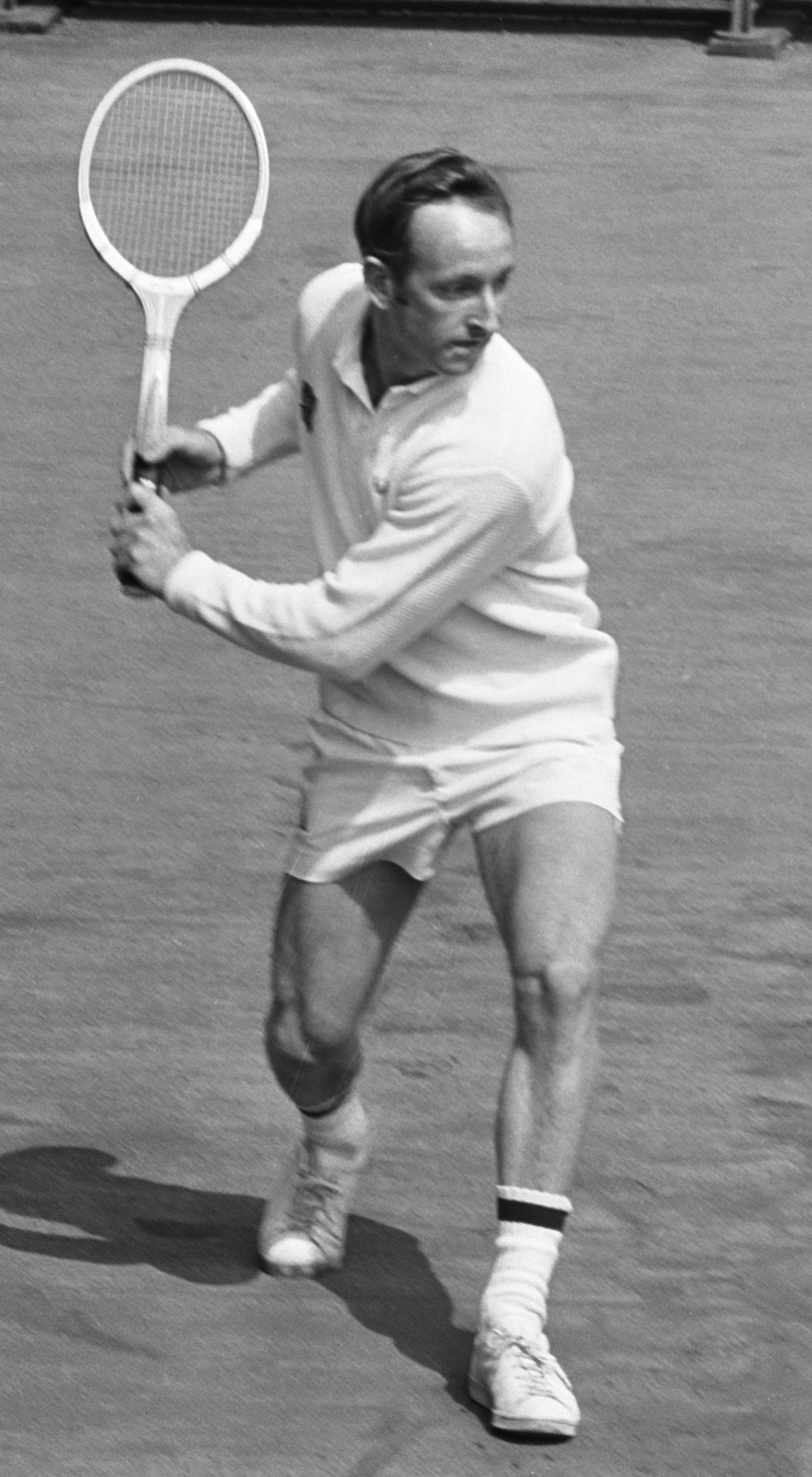
Laver

- Rod Laver of Australia became only the second person in history to win the "Grand Slam" of tennis, after taking the men's singles title in the U.S. Open, by defeating fellow Queenslander Roy Emerson, 6–2, 6–4, 5–7 and 6–4. Earlier in 1962, he won the Australian Open (January), the French Open (June) and Wimbledon (July).
- The railroad line between Taunton and Chard Junction, within Somerset, became the first casualty of the "Beeching cuts" after the Chairman of British Railways, Richard Beeching, began shutting down unprofitable railroad lines. For the next 13 years, passenger service would be halted permanently at 29 separate rail routes, a process accelerated after the publishing of the "Beeching Report" on March 27, 1963. An author would note later that the closures would eliminate 4,500 miles (7,200 km) of routes, 2,500 stations, and 67,700 jobs.
- Speaking for the U.S. Supreme Court, Justice Hugo Black halted further stays against enforcement of a lower court decision and ordered the immediate admission of James Meredith as the first African-American student at the then-segregated University of Mississippi. Black wrote that the enrollment of Meredith as a student "can do no appreciable harm to the university".
- The Mercury 8 launch mission was postponed to September 28, 1962, to allow additional time for flight preparation.
- Born: Co Stompé, Dutch darts player and 2010 World Cup of Darts champion; in Amsterdam

== September 11, 1962 (Tuesday) ==
- Weeks before the discovery of nuclear missiles that would lead to the Cuban Missile Crisis, the Soviet Union publicly warned that a U.S. attack on Cuba, or on Soviet ships carrying supplies to the island, would mean war. In a statement read at the Foreign Office in Moscow, the government declared, "One cannot now attack Cuba and expect that the aggressor will be free from punishment for this attack. If such an attack is made, this will be the beginning of unleashing war... which might plunge the world into the disaster of a universal world war with the use of thermonuclear weapons."
- Manned Spacecraft Center (MSC) aerospace technologists William G. Davis and Robert L. Turner compiled a description of instrumentation that would be required on a space station. Such equipment comprised three areas: (1) support and laboratory systems for crew safety and for scientific experiments; (2) scientific instrumentation for study of a true space environment and for advancement of scientific knowledge of space; and (3) the power system for a space station, a choice between 400-cycle AC or 28-volt DC sources.
- Thurgood Marshall was confirmed by the U.S. Senate as a judge on the U.S. Court of Appeals for the Second Circuit, 353 days after he had been nominated, by a vote of 56–14. Marshall, an African-American who had argued the landmark case of Brown v. Board of Education, and who would later be elevated to the U.S. Supreme Court, had been serving for eleven months after President Kennedy had made an appointment, subject to Senate approval, while Congress was not in session.
- Big Sur, by Jack Kerouac, was first published.
- Died: Robert Soblen, 61, an American spy who had been awaiting extradition to the United States to begin a life sentence in prison on conviction of espionage for the Soviet Union, died five days after he lapsed into a coma from a barbiturate overdose. Minutes before he was to board Pan Am Flight 101 from London to New York, Soblen collapsed at the London Airport (now called Heathrow). Although suicide was an obvious motive, investigators speculated that Soblen may have been poisoned by the Soviet KGB in order to prevent him from revealing the identities of other spies.

== September 12, 1962 (Wednesday) ==
- The first "mystery" satellite in the history of space exploration was launched, according to British magazine Flight International. The object of unknown origin orbited at a height of 113 miles (182 km) and reentered the Earth's atmosphere 12 days later. An unidentified spokesman speculated that the satellite belonged to the U.S. Air Force, but that this was a "scientific guess based on our assessment of previous satellite launchings." No official U.S. listing included such a satellite, nor a launch confirmation.
- U.S. President John F. Kennedy, in a speech at the football stadium of Rice University in Houston, reaffirmed that the U.S. would put a man on the Moon by the end of the decade. On hand were 40,000 people, mostly students. Kennedy had declared, on May 25, 1961, his belief that the nation should commit to a crewed Moon landing, which would be achieved on July 20, 1969.
- NASA announced it would launch a special satellite before the end of the year "to obtain information on possible effects of radiation on future satellites and to give the world's scientific community additional data on the artificial environment created by the radiation belt."
- President Kennedy visited the Manned Spacecraft Center and was shown exhibits of the Mercury, Gemini, and Apollo spacecraft hardware.

== September 13, 1962 (Thursday) ==
- Governor of Mississippi Ross Barnett delivered a 20-minute address on statewide television and radio to urge state officials not to obey the federal court order to integrate the University of Mississippi, signing a legal document to implement the legal doctrine of interposition, whereby state law superseded a contrary federal government action. The Governor declared, "We will not drink from the cup of genocide. There is no case in history where the Caucasian race has survived integration." Barnett then made a proclamation, saying "I hereby direct each official to uphold and enforce the laws duly and legally enacted by the legislature of the State of Mississippi, regardless of this unwarranted, illegal and arbitrary usurpation of power," and added, "There is no cause which is more moral and just than the protection of the integrity of our races."
- In elections in Grenada for the 15-member Legislative Council of the British Crown Colony, Chief Minister Herbert Blaize's Grenada National Party won 6 of the 10 elected seats.

== September 14, 1962 (Friday) ==
- An interagency coordination meeting defined the uncrewed first Gemini mission as a spacecraft maximum-heating-rate test. As many spacecraft systems as possible were to be tested, to allow the second flight to carry astronauts. Another meeting on September 18 set ground rules for the first mission. The trajectory was to be ballistic with a range of about 2,200 miles (3,500 km). The primary objective was to obtain thermodynamics and structures data, and the secondary objective was partial qualification of spacecraft systems.
- Frederick S. Modise, a minister of South Africa's Zion Christian Church, was inspired to form a separate Christian denomination while in the Coronation Hospital in Johannesburg for what was diagnosed as an incurable illness. Modise, who would found the International Pentecost Holiness Church of South Africa, would say later that a voice had told him that he would be healed and would be able to return home on October 3. For the remainder of his life, Reverend Modise would minister to other ill patients.
- Teledu Cymru (now Wales West and North Television) began broadcasting to the North and West Wales region of Britain, extending the ITV Network to the whole of the United Kingdom. Transmitters were located at Pembroke, Caernarvon and Flint.
- Died: William Lindsay Gresham, 53, American novelist and non-fiction author, took an overdose of sleeping pills after having been diagnosed with incurable cancer

== September 15, 1962 (Saturday) ==
- The first Soviet medium-range missiles were deployed in Cuba, a week after their arrival. On the same day, American electronic intelligence detected that Soviet high-altitude surface-to-air missiles had become operational. An SA-2 (or S-75) Dvina missile had downed the U-2 spy plane flown by Francis Gary Powers in 1960, and the weapons, located near the port of Mariel, were capable of stopping further American attempts to verify a missile buildup.
- Iran's foreign minister Abbas Aram and Soviet Union Ambassador Nikolai Pegov signed an agreement providing that Iran would not allow any foreign nation to set up rocket bases on its soil.
- Died: William Coblentz, 88, American physicist

== September 16, 1962 (Sunday) ==
- The first semiconductor laser began operation, using a gallium arsenide compound. The initial test was done by Gunter Fenner at the General Electric Research Laboratory in Schenectady, New York.
- British driver Graham Hill won the Italian Grand Prix, held at Monza.
- Born:
  - Joanne Catherall, English vocalist for The Human League; in Sheffield, South Yorkshire
  - Josephus Thimister, Belgian designer; in Maastricht (died by suicide, 2019)

== September 17, 1962 (Monday) ==
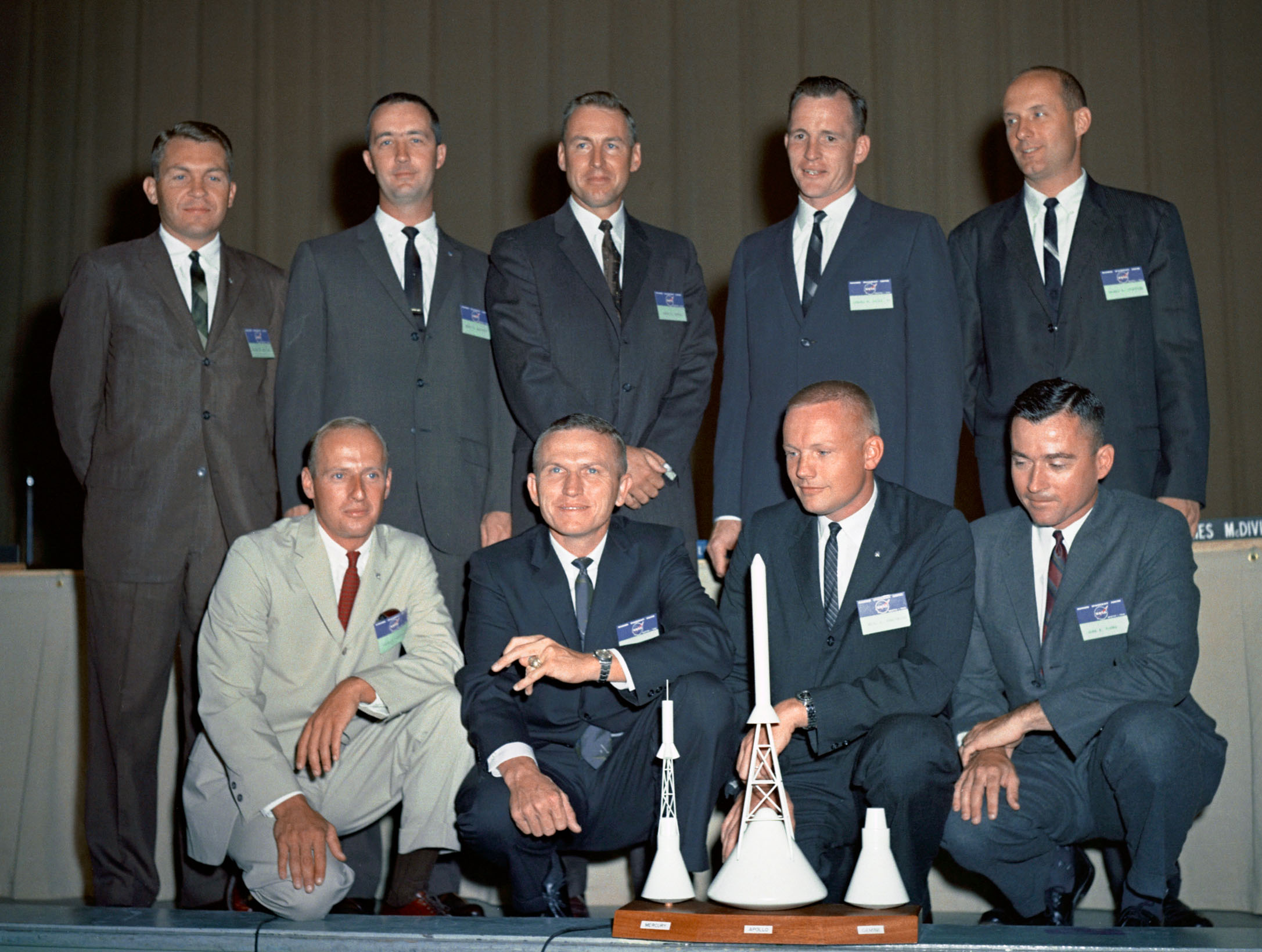
September 17, 1962: The Group 2 astronauts

- Nine new American astronauts, officially members of NASA Astronaut Group 2, were introduced at a press conference at the University of Houston. Manned Space Center Director Robert R. Gilruth introduced the selections for the training program for the Gemini and Apollo flights. Of the nine, four were from the U.S. Air Force, three were from the U.S. Navy, and two were civilians. The "New Nine" were civilians Neil Armstrong and Elliot See; USAF officers Frank Borman, James McDivitt, Thomas P. Stafford, and Ed White; and Navy officers Pete Conrad, Jim Lovell, and John Young. Armstrong would become the first man to walk on the Moon (Conrad would be third and Young ninth). Borman and Lovell would orbit the Moon; White would be the first American to "walk in space" but would die in the fire of Apollo 1; Young would command the Space Shuttle's first launched mission; and See would die in a plane crash before he could fly in space.
- Studies by the U.S. Navy School of Aviation Medicine found that astronaut John Glenn had received less than one-half the cosmic radiation dosage expected during his orbital flight, because of the excellent protection by the walls of his Mercury 6 capsule.
- The final prototype of the Mil Mi-8 helicopter, with 1,500 shaft horsepower engines, was given its initial test flight. The Soviet, and later Russian-built, machine would sell more units than any other helicopter in history.
- Khalid al-Azm became Prime Minister of Syria for the sixth (and last) time, succeeding Bashir al-Azma. The Ba'ath Party would overthrow the Syrian government on March 8, 1963, and al-Azm would be arrested.
- BBC Wales Today was broadcast for the first time. As of September 17, 2022, it had been on the air for sixty years as one of the world's longest-running daily television news programmes.
- Born:
  - BeBe Winans (stage name for Benjamin Winans), American gospel singer and brother of CeCe Winans; in Detroit
  - Paul Feig, American TV director and actor; in Royal Oak, Michigan

== September 18, 1962 (Tuesday) ==
- U.S. Marine Corps helicopters flew a combat mission from Da Nang, South Vietnam, for the first time, airlifting South Vietnamese troops into the hills south of Da Nang.
- Deke Slayton, one of the seven chosen for the Mercury astronaut training program, was designated Coordinator of Astronaut Activities at the Manned Spacecraft Center in the United States.
- Died: Therese Neumann, 64, German Catholic mystic and stigmatic. Her followers said that she had inedia, the ability to survive without food, and that she had stopped eating in 1926.

== September 19, 1962 (Wednesday) ==
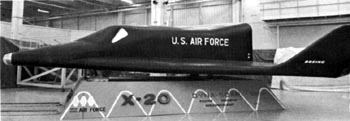
"Vicious ugliness'- the Dyna-Soar

- A full-scale mockup of the Boeing X-20 Dyna-Soar spaceplane was unveiled for reporters in Las Vegas, where the Air Force Association was holding its annual convention, and the six pilots who would be the first to fly the X-20 were introduced. "Technical men familiar with sketches and photographs of the X-20 were startled by the vicious ugliness" of the plane, the Associated Press reported, noting that "With its upturned wingtips and long snout, the X-20 looks like its designer had somehow managed to cross a manta ray with a shark." The Dyna-Soar project, scheduled for a 1965 launch, would be cancelled after cost overruns, and none were ever built.

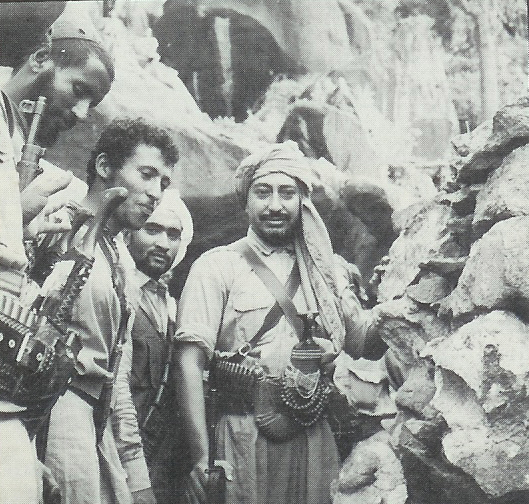
The last Imam of Yemen

- Prince Saif Al-Islam Muhammad al-Badr became the new Imam of Yemen, following the death of his 71-year-old father, Imam Ahmad bin Yahya, who was described at his death as "despotic", "the perennial target of assassins", and a man "said to have died from natural causes hastened by old wounds". The following day, al-Badr was proclaimed at the Imam Al-Mansoor Billah. His reign would last for a week before he was overthrown.
- The United States Intelligence Board reviewed all available data on arms shipments to Cuba and reported to President Kennedy, erroneously, that there was no basis for speculation that nuclear missiles would be placed on the Caribbean island.
- The first episode of The Virginian, starring James Drury in the title role (the character's real name was never revealed), was shown on NBC as the first 90-minute weekly TV series. It would run nine seasons, ending in 1971.
- MSC's Life Systems Division reported that studies were underway for spacewalks during Gemini missions. These included evaluation of a superinsulation coverall to be worn for thermal protection over the pressure suit; ventilation system requirements and hardware; and methods of maneuvering near the spacecraft.
- ACF Electronics delivered an engineering prototype radar beacon to McDonnell for Project Gemini. An engineering prototype C-band beacon had operated at ACF Electronics under simulated reentry conditions with no degradation in performance.
- Died: Nikolai Pogodin, 61, Soviet playwright

== September 20, 1962 (Thursday) ==
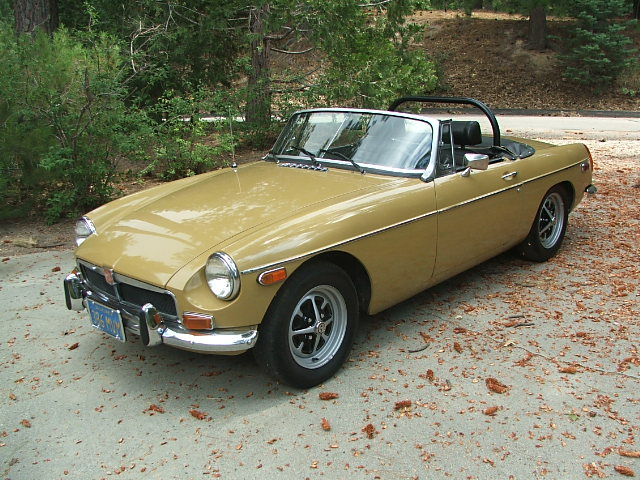
The MGB

- The MGB sports car was introduced by MG Cars. Over the next 18 years, 500,000 MGBs would be sold, making it the best selling sports car in history.
- Escorted by federal marshals James Meredith arrived at Oxford, Mississippi, in order to become the first African-American to enroll at the University of Mississippi. Governor Ross Barnett personally blocked Meredith's entrance into the admissions building.
- Voting was conducted for Algeria's first Constituent Assembly since the nation's independence, with voters being given a choice of "yes" or "no" for the 196 candidates from the National Liberation Front, led by Ahmed Ben Bella.
- Died:
  - Robert Colquhoun, 47, Scottish painter, printmaker and theatre set designer, died after collapsing in a small private art gallery in Bloomsbury, London, where he was working to meet a deadline.
  - Conrad Helfrich, 75, Dutch naval commander of World War II

== September 21, 1962 (Friday) ==
- The UN General Assembly approved a ceasefire agreement between Indonesia and the Netherlands, with UN military observers from six nations monitoring the agreement. A larger UN Security Force would arrive at West Irian on October 3.
- Composer Igor Stravinsky returned to Russia after an absence of 48 years, as a guest of the Soviet Union.
- The British music magazine New Musical Express published a story about two 13-year-old schoolgirls, "Sue" and "Mary", releasing a disc on Decca, and added that "A Liverpool group, The Beatles, have recorded "Love Me Do" for Parlophone Records, set for October 5 release."
- Born: Rob Morrow, American TV actor known for Northern Exposure and NUMB3RS; in New Rochelle, New York
- Died: Marie Bonaparte, 80, French author and psychoanalyst

== September 22, 1962 (Saturday) ==
- India's Defence Ministry officials met to discuss plans to drive out Chinese troops from the disputed border area at Thang La ridge. Despite the argument by General P. N. Thaper, the Chief of the Army Staff of Indian Army, that Chinese troops at the border outnumbered those from India, General Thaper was given a written order to "prepare and throw out the Chinese as soon as possible".
- Autostrada 1, a 125-mile (201 km) long superhighway between Rome and Naples, opened to traffic. Travel time between the two Italian cities was cut almost in half, from 3 1/2 hours to two hours.

== September 23, 1962 (Sunday) ==
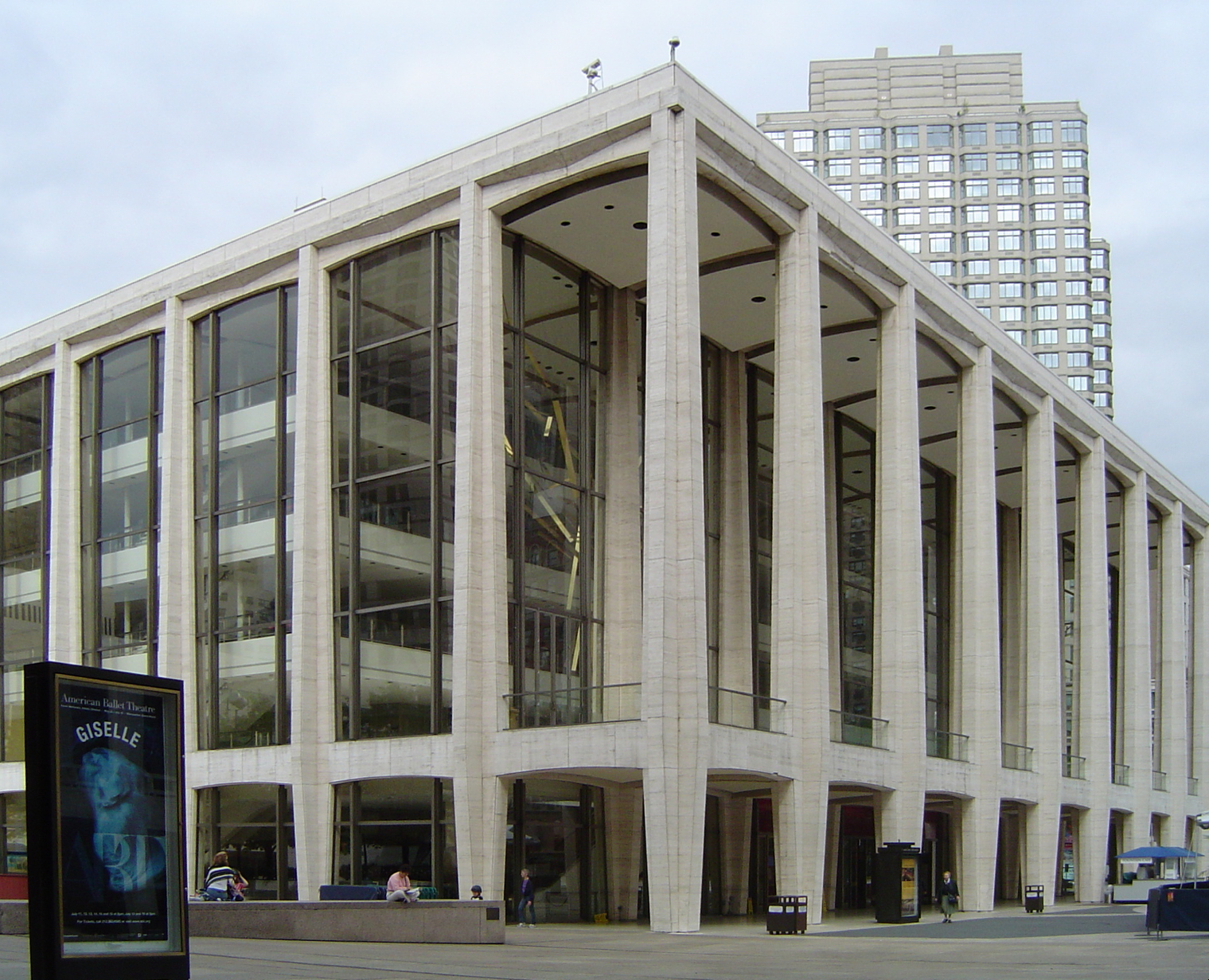
The new Philharmonic Hall

- The Lincoln Center for the Performing Arts, including its modern Philharmonic Hall, later Avery Fisher Hall, opened in New York City. The inaugural concert, which was televised live on CBS, featured Leonard Bernstein, the New York Philharmonic Orchestra, and a host of operatic stars such as Eileen Farrell and Robert Merrill.
- The crash of Flying Tiger Line Flight 923 killed 28 of the 76 people on board. The L-1049H Super Constellation was on its way from the United States to West Germany when it ditched into the Atlantic Ocean after three of its four engines failed. The 48 survivors were rescued by the Swiss ship Celerina. The crash investigation determined that the accident was caused by the failure of engine No. 3, the accidental closing of a shutoff valve on engine No. 1 by the flight engineer, and the failure of engine No. 2 as the plane was proceeding to the nearest available airport.
- The Jetsons— George, Jane, Judy and Elroy— were introduced in a primetime cartoon of the same name at 7:30 p.m. Eastern time on the ABC television network. Despite having only 24 episodes, the science fiction show, about a family living about 100 years in the future, would be rerun for 23 years until new episodes were commissioned for a syndicated revival in 1985.
- The Soviet Union Council of Ministers approved the development of the Global Rocket 1 (GR-1) missile, with the goal of a weapon with a range of 12,500 miles (20,100 km), capable of hitting a target anywhere on Earth. The project would be cancelled in 1964 in favor of the R-36 orbiting missile, designated as the SS-18 by NATO.
- Unbeknownst to the world, Pope John XXIII was diagnosed with terminal stomach cancer. He would pass away on June 3, 1963.
- Born: Robert Molle, Canadian athlete who won a silver Olympic medal in wrestling in 1984, and later captained the Winnipeg Blue Bombers of the Canadian Football League; in Saskatoon

== September 24, 1962 (Monday) ==
- Samuel Barber's Piano Concerto, performed by John Browning, premiered at the Philharmonic Hall.
- Born:
  - Ally McCoist, Scottish footballer, manager and television personality; in Bellshill, North Lanarkshire
  - Sergey Schepkin, Russian pianist; in Leningrad (now Saint Petersburg)

== September 25, 1962 (Tuesday) ==
- In Yemen, Abdullah as-Sallal launched a coup d'état aimed at the overthrow of the new Imam, Muhammad al-Badr. Sallal's troops shelled the royal palace, thought they had buried the Imam in the rubble, and proclaimed his death on Aden radio. However, al-Badr had escaped and would attempt a rebellion against the newly proclaimed government.
- Floyd Patterson and Sonny Liston fought for the world heavyweight boxing title in Chicago. Liston made history by being the first man ever to knock out a reigning heavyweight champion in the first round, downing the titleholder in 2 minutes and 6 seconds.
- The new Constitutional Assembly elected Ferhat Abbas the President of Algeria and formally proclaimed the foundation of the Democratic and Popular Republic of Algeria during their opening session.
- Ground rules were set for all NASA contractors at a review conference for NASA's complex 14 was held in Los Angeles, with stand availability by July 1, 1963; beneficial occupancy by November 1, 1963; and having a rocket on-stand by February 1, 1964. Complex 14 would be used for launching the Gemini-Agena target vehicle and Mariner spacecraft, as well as the Gemini program.

== September 26, 1962 (Wednesday) ==
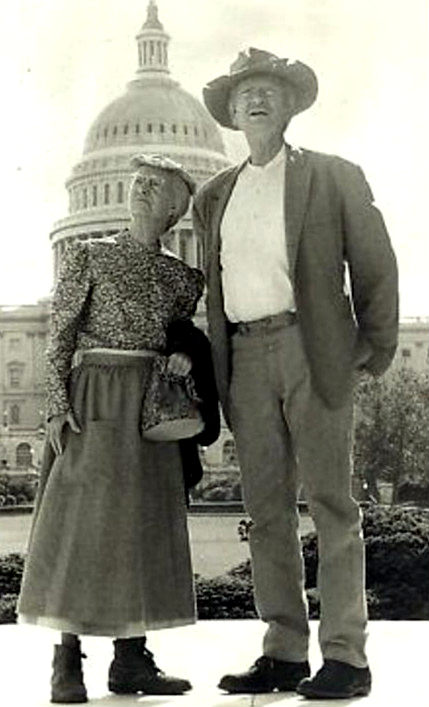
Irene Ryan and Buddy Ebsen

- The Beverly Hillbillies, a television situation comedy about a poor Ozark Mountain family who became multi-millionaires after oil was found on their land, began a nine-year run on the CBS network, with the first episode premiering at 9:00 p.m. Eastern time. UPI television critic Rick Du Brow wrote the next day that the series "is going to be a smash hit" in that it was similar in premise to TV program The Real McCoys, but added that "The nicest thing I can say... is that it is really not like 'The Real McCoys'... The McCoys are a civilized rural clan; these new hillbillies make L'il Abner and his mob look like a bunch of sophisticates." Within three weeks, it was the most-watched series on American television, and stayed at #1 in its first two seasons. The show had 274 episodes, with the final one broadcast on March 23, 1971.
- Restaurant entrepreneur Harland Sanders filed a patent application for his invention, a "process of producing fried chicken under pressure", describing a system using a pressure cooker with the object "to provide a novel process for quickly and thoroughly frying chicken under pressure in a manner to seal in substantially all the natural juices while browning the breaded surface thereof to desired crispness and appearance." U.S. Patent No. 3,245,800 would be granted on April 12, 1966, and was assigned by Sanders to the Kentucky Fried Chicken Corporation.
- As the North Yemen Civil War progressed, all areas of the Yemeni city of San'a were in the hands of the new Yemen government, led by Abdullah as-Sallal, and he proclaimed the Yemen Arab Republic.
- A flash flood killed 445 people, in Barcelona and in the nearby villages of Sabadell and Terrassa in the Catalan region of Spain.
- Born:
  - Chunky Panday (stage name for Suyash Panday), Indian film actor; in Bombay (now Mumbai)
  - Mark Haddon, English author of children's books; in Northampton

== September 27, 1962 (Thursday) ==
- Rachel Carson's book Silent Spring was released, giving rise to the modern environmentalist movement.
- The 25th Canadian Parliament opened its first and only session, adjourning on February 6, 1963.

== September 28, 1962 (Friday) ==
- Yemeni radio announced the death of former ruler, Muhammad al-Badr. Al-Badr had, in fact, escaped the country and was living in Saudi Arabia.
- Prime Minister Ahmed Ben Bella founded the first government of independent Algeria.
- Planning for a U.S. space station was discussed at Washington by executives of NASA's Office of Manned Space Flight (OMSF), the Office of Advanced Research and Technology (OART), the Manned Spacecraft Center (MSC), Marshall Space Flight Center (MSFC), and Langley Research Center. The OMSF allowed $2.2 million to MSC and $300,000 to MSFC for contractor-related studies, and funding to Langley of $800,000.
- Wally Schirra made a 6-and-a-half-hour simulated flight of the Mercury 8 spacecraft. A worldwide tracking network of 21 ground stations and ships also participated in the exercise.
- Born: Fred Merkel, American motorcycle racing champion; in Stockton, California

== September 29, 1962 (Saturday) ==
- Canada's Alouette 1, the first satellite built outside the United States and the Soviet Union, was launched from Vandenberg Air Force Base in California.
- In order to prevent the University of Mississippi from making any further efforts to prevent James Meredith from becoming the first African-American to enroll there, U.S. President Kennedy issued a proclamation commanding all persons engaged in the obstruction of the laws and the orders of the courts to "cease and desist therefrom and to disperse and retire peaceably forthwith", citing his authority under 10 U.S.C. § 332, § 333, and § 334 to use the militia or the armed forces to suppress any insurrection, domestic violence, unlawful combination, or conspiracy."
- My Fair Lady ended its Broadway run after more than six years and 2,717 performances, a Broadway record that would stand until surpassed later by Hello, Dolly!.
- Reconnaissance aircraft indicated the formation of a tropical depression to the east of the Lesser Antilles, which would later develop into Hurricane Daisy.

== September 30, 1962 (Sunday) ==
- James Meredith was escorted by a team of United States Marshals to the campus of the University of Mississippi for enrollment as the first African-American student at "Ole Miss". That evening, at 8:15 p.m., rioting broke out as a mob joined students on the campus, and the 4,000 troops of the 108th Armored Cavalry Regiment of the Mississippi National Guard was "federalized" under the command of Brigadier General Charles Billingslea of the U.S. Army to restore order, taking the side of the United States against the State of Mississippi.Two civilians were killed by unknown persons, which many believed to be rioters. Paul Guihard, a British reporter on assignment for the Agence France-Presse, was shot in the back, and a local jukebox repairman, George Gunter, was shot in the head while visiting the situation out of curiosity.
- In the final scheduled games of the 1962 Major League Baseball season, the San Francisco Giants (100–61) defeated the Houston Colt .45s, 2–1, while the Los Angeles Dodgers (101–60) lost to the St. Louis Cardinals, 1–0, giving both the Giants and Dodgers identical 101–61 records and first place in the National League, and forcing a playoff series between the two. The Dodgers, who had had a two-game lead with only four games left in the season, went on to lose the playoff to the Giants, who would go on to the 1962 World Series.
- The National Farm Workers of America, which would later merge with the Agricultural Workers Organizing Committee to form the United Farm Workers of America, was founded in Fresno, California by Cesar Chavez.
- The CBS Radio Network broadcast the final episodes of Suspense and Yours Truly, Johnny Dollar, marking the end of the Golden Age of Radio.
- Died: Muhammad VIII al-Amin, 85, last Bey of Tunisia, who reigned from 1943 to 1957 before the abolition of the monarchy
