= William Bedford Van Lare =

Ghanaian jurist

Justice William Bedford Van Lare

Supreme Court Judge
- In office 1960–1963
- Appointed by: Dr. Kwame Nkrumah

Ghana High Commissioner to Canada
- In office 1966–1969

Personal details
- Born: William Bedford Van Lare; 7 September 1904 Kpong, Volta Region, Gold Coast
- Died: 3 September 1969 (aged 64) Accra
- Spouse: Mrs. Aleen van Lare
- Education: University of London
- Occupation: Judge

William Bedford Van Lare CMG (1904-1969) was a Ghanaian jurist and diplomat; he was justice of the Supreme Court of Ghana in the first republic and Ghana's High Commissioner to Canada in the NLC regime.

== Early life and education ==
William was born in 1904 at Kpong in the Volta Region to William Ludwig Van Lare, Esq. (A merchant) and Wilhemina Fiawonu Van Lare (née Amegashie) both of Keta. He had his early education at Bremen Mission School, Keta and his secondary education at Mfantsipim School, Cape Coast. He obtained his bachelor of Laws degree from the University College, London a constituent college of the University of London and continued his studies at Lincoln's Inn, London for his Barrister-at-Law certificate.

== Career ==
He taught at Mfantsipim School and Government schools in Accra and Obo before his law studies abroad. He was called to the bar in 1937 and worked in chambers with his friend Kofi Adumua Bossman who also became a Supreme Court Judge. In 1943, he was appointed magistrate, working in Cape Coast, Accra and Kumasi. He acted as Chief Registrar of the West African Court of Appeal in 1948 and 1950. In 1952, he was puisne judge in the superior bench and in 1957 he became an Appeal Court Judge and Supreme Judge that same year. He resigned in 1963 when the Supreme Court acquitted Tawia Adamafio and others on treason charges in December 1963. He was a foundation fellow of the Ghana Academy of Arts and Sciences in 1959 he served as treasurer for the academy.

In 1966 he was appointed Ghana's High Commissioner to Canada by the NLC government.

== Honours ==
The title of Companion of the Order of St. Michael and St. George (C.M.G.) was conferred upon him by Her Majesty Queen Elizabeth II.

He was honoured by the Government of Lebanon with the title; Commander of the National Order of the Cedar. In 1967 he was given the Grand Medal of Ghana by the Ghana government.

== Family ==
He is the grandson of Charles Leone Van Lare, Esq., of Accra and the great grandson of Mantse Nii Akrashie I of James Town, Accra. He was married to Mrs. Alice Van Lare, together they had four children.

== Death ==
He died on 3 September 1969 in Accra after a short illness. He was given a state burial with full honours by the order of the then government; the National Liberation Council.

== See also ==
- List of judges of the Supreme Court of Ghana
- Supreme Court of Ghana
- 1960 Birthday Honours
