= Test 219 =

Thermonuclear explosion

Coordinates: 73.3000°N 57.5000°E

Information
- Country: Soviet Union
- Test site: Novaya Zemlya Test Range, Russian Soviet Federative Socialist Republic
- Date: December 22, 1962
- Number of tests: 1
- Test type: Atmospheric Test
- Device type: Fusion
- Max. yield: Total yield 24.3 megatons of TNT (102 PJ)

Test chronology

Test 219 was a nuclear test conducted by the Soviet Union in the atmosphere via ICBM. The test was performed on December 22, 1962 over the Novaya Zemlya test range, in the 1962 Soviet nuclear tests. It was a thermonuclear fusion bomb with a yield of about 24.4 megatons and a destruction radius of about 6 mi (9.7 km), making it the second largest thermonuclear explosion in history, only behind the Tsar Bomba test. It exploded at height of 2.44 mi (3.75 km).
