= Kulungugu bomb attack =

Failed assassination attempt

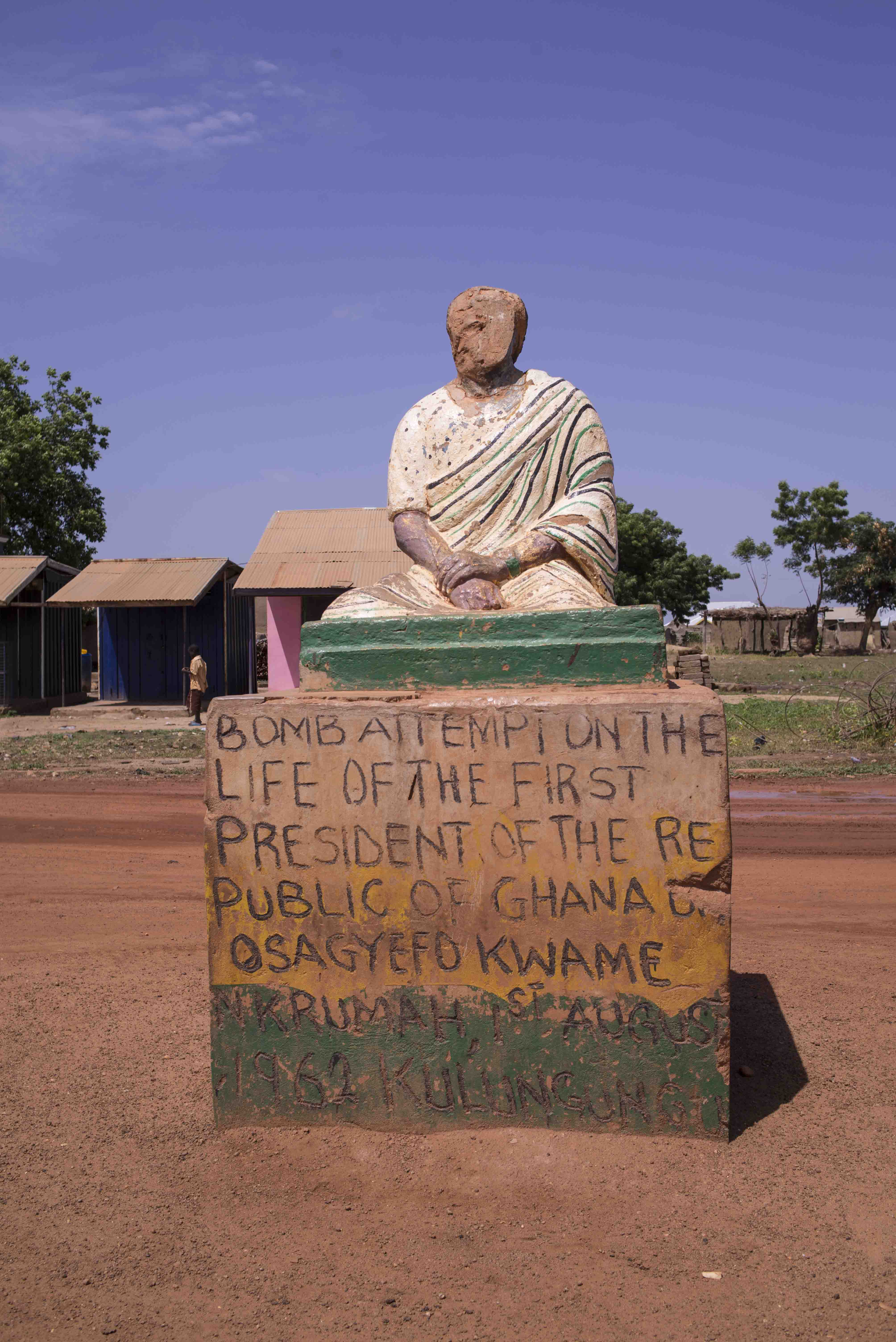
The statue is the place where Ghana's First President Osagyefo Kwame Nkrumah was attacked on 1 August 1962". The statue is on the exact point where the bomb attack happened.

The Kulungugu bomb attack was a failed assassination attempt on Kwame Nkrumah, the President of Ghana.

On 1 August 1962, Kwame Nkrumah stopped in Kulungugu, a minor port of entry in the Pusiga District in Upper East Bawku. There was a bomb explosion aimed at killing the President.

== History ==
Nkrumah was coming from a meeting with President Maurice Yaméogo in Tenkodogo, Burkina Faso, at the time known as Upper Volta. The meeting was to sign documents relating to the construction of the major hydroelectric project on the Volta which would become Lake Volta.

During the trip back to Ghana, heavy rains caused difficulties for the convoy on the country's bad roads. The Presidential convoy stopped at an outskirts of Bawku to greet school children who had been waving and catching glimpses of the President. A school child, Elizabeth Asantewaa, approached the president with a bouquet of flowers, was severely injured when the bomb exploded. The president was saved by his bodyguard, Captain Samuel Buckman, who instinctively wrestled the president to the ground after hearing the ticking of the timing device. The President and Buckman experience non life-threatening injuries, but 55 other people were injured.

Nkrumah was treated by a British doctor at Bawku Hospital, who removed shrapnel from the President's back and side.

A memorial stands at the site of the bombing.

== Aftermath and trial ==
Nkrumah accused Tawia Adamafio, the Minister of Information, Broadcasting and Presidential affairs, Ako Adjei, the Minister of Foreign Affairs, and H.H. Cofie-Crabbe, Executive Secretary of the Convention People's Party, of being behind the assassination plot. They were jailed under the Preventive Detention Act.

The three were cleared by a court headed by Chief Justice Arku Korsah in a trial which lasted for a year. Nkrumah had Korsah dismissed, and appointed a new court to recharge the men. Nkrumah handpicked the jury that found the three guilty and they were sentenced to death. Later, the death sentences were commuted to twenty year sentences.

After Kwame Nkrumah was ousted from office in 1966, the three were released by the National Liberation Council (NLC).
