= Plymouth Mail robbery =

1962 cash heist in Massachusetts

The Plymouth Mail robbery, or what the press dubbed "The Great Plymouth Mail Truck Robbery" was, at the time of its occurrence, the largest cash heist of all time. On August 14, 1962, two gunmen stopped a U.S. Mail truck that was delivering $1.5 million in small bills from Cape Cod to the Federal Reserve Bank in Boston, Massachusetts. The hijacking occurred on Route 3 in Plymouth, Massachusetts. The two robbers, dressed as police officers and brandishing submachine guns, tied up the driver of the truck and the guard and drove the truck themselves to places unknown, where the money was dropped off in several places. The truck and its two tied-up occupants were abandoned in Randolph, Massachusetts, alongside Route 128.

For five years the United States Postal Inspection Service as well as the FBI intensively combed New England for leads in the robbery, but were frustrated at the lack of evidence. Authorities even at one time offered a $150,000 or 10% of the amount recovered (Federal Reserve Bank of Boston) cash reward in addition to the $50,000 Postmaster General reward for information leading to the conviction of those responsible for the caper, even going so far as to deem any suspect killed in his apprehension to be deemed "convicted" for purposes of the reward. The combination of media, law enforcement, and popular interest in this record-breaking robbery combined for an atmosphere of near-hysteria in the Boston area throughout the early and middle 1960s. Not a few completely uninvolved people were accused of being involved in the heist, with the media loudly proclaiming their guilt even with no evidence or facts to support its claims.

With the five-year federal statute of limitations approaching with no real leads to solve the robbery, the Postal Inspectorate and the Department of Justice stepped up a campaign of near-total surveillance and harassment of all known armed robbers in the Boston area in a frantic effort to obtain clues about the robber's identities. Shortly before the statute of limitations was to expire, a federal grand jury indicted four men and one woman as the perpetrators of this robbery. One of the defendants disappeared right before trial and was never found. The other defendants were acquitted at trial.

To this day the haul of $1.5 million in cash (equivalent to approximately $15,600,000 in 2023 money) remains undiscovered by the authorities.

Vincent "Fat Vinnie" Teresa, a Boston mobster who served as a lieutenant of Raymond L.S. Patriarca, claimed in his book My Life in the Mafia that John "Red" Kelley was the man who planned the robbery. He allegedly received a generous 80 cents on the dollar when the money was laundered.
