= John Kelley (criminal) =

American mobster

- Born: John Joseph Kelley; June 3, 1914
- Died: February 10, 2000 (aged 85)
- Other names: Red Kelley; Irish Red Kelley; Jack Kelley; Swiss Watch; Saint John
- Occupation: Mobster
- Allegiance: Patriarca crime family

John Joseph Kelley (known as "Red Kelley"; a.k.a. "Irish Red Kelley" and "Jack Kelley") (3 June 1914 –10 February 2000) was a reputed mobster who was an associate of the Patriarca crime family. A robber and a hit man, his nicknames in the underworld were "Swiss Watch," due to the methodical way in which he plotted his robberies, and "Saint John," due to his patience.

== Early criminal career ==
Kelley's first arrest took place on May 24, 1954 at the Suffolk Downs Race Track. The police alleged that Kelley had in his possession 16 brand new $1 bills which bore the serial numbers of money stolen from a bank in Belmont nearly two months earlier.

Kelley pleaded not guilty to the charge of “receiving of stolen goods”. After ten hours of deliberation by the jury, a mistrial was declared in January 1955.

The retrial began in March 1955. The judge declared that Kelley could not be convicted of both robbing the bank and of receiving stolen goods, so the jury had to choose one crime or the other. Kelley was subsequently found guilty of the lesser charge of receiving stolen goods and sentenced to four to five years in State Prison. His appeal was rejected in November 1955 by the Massachusetts Supreme Court.

Kelley spent the last part of his 22 month stretch in prison as a chaplain's assistant in the Plymouth area at one of the camps that were adjuncts to the Massachusetts State Prison system.

== Plymouth mail robbery ==
Kelley was linked to the 1962 Plymouth Mail Robbery. Boston mobster Vincent Teresa served as a lieutenant to mob family boss Raymond Patriarca; he claimed in his book My Life in the Mafia that Kelley was the man who planned the robbery.

Kelley came under intense scrutiny and pressure from postal inspectors and other federal authorities towards the expiration of the five-year statute of limitations. Newsweek magazine quoted him as saying that the postal inspectors "had harassed my wife and frightened my Siamese cats."

Kelley sued Postal Inspector Raymond J Dunne, alleging that in October 1962 Dunne and his colleagues had lied to gain entrance to his home by informing his wife that they had an outstanding warrant for Kelley's arrest. In March 1965, the First District Appeals Court reversed a lower court decision which had dismissed the damage suit, and sent it back to the lower court. However, a rehearing was denied later the following month.

Kelley also brought a slander suit against Postal Inspector Raymond J Dunne, alleging that the Inspector had falsely and maliciously stated to Kelley's wife that he (Kelley) was one of the perpetrators of the Plymouth Mail Robbery. Kelley did not testify on his own behalf as he had not been present when the Postal Authorities raided his home, but Kelley's wife was the principal witness. Kelley had also sought the return of $235 that had been seized by the Postal Inspectors, as well as two money bags from the First National Bank of Boston, and a piece of clothesline. The suit was rejected in July 1966.

Kelley, Thomas R Richards, and Patricia Diaferio were indicted by a Federal Grand Jury on July 30, 1967. The indictments came just 14 days before the Federal statute of limitations was set to run out. The three were charged with armed robbery of the US Mail while putting the lives of postal workers in jeopardy by means of dangerous weapons, namely guns Kelley was represented by attorney F. Lee Bailey, who won an acquittal.

== 1968 Boston Brinks holdup ==
Kelley allegedly was involved in the planning of the robbery of a Brink's armored car in Boston on December 28, 1968 that netted approximately $500,000 in cash and a similar amount in checks. Kelley had intended to be part of the gang that robbed the armored car, but had backed out after two previous attempts failed. He demanded and did receive a cut of the proceeds and eventually was questioned by a grand jury. His confederates believed that he gave them up to the federal prosecutors. Once again, he was represented by Bailey.

== Castro assassination ==
Kelley told US Marshall John Partington that the CIA had approached him to use his crew to kill Fidel Castro. Vinny Teresa claimed in his book that the CIA approached Raymond Patriarca for the hit and Raymond picked Pro Lerner, who then recruited Kelley to plan the hit.

== Patriarca Family murder trial ==
Kelley testified against Patriarca family boss Raymond Patriarca in a murder case, after which he went into the Federal Witness Protection Program. Kelley gave testimony linking Patriarca and other family members to the murder of Rudolph "Rudy" Marfeo and Anthony Melei. Kelley had been contracted by Patriarca associate Maurice Lerner to kill Marfeo and Melei, whom Kelley allegedly murdered with a shotgun.

Patriarca and his associates were convicted of conspiracy to commit murder while Lerner also was convicted of murder; the mob boss was sentenced to 10 years in prison. Lerner and the other defendants were subsequently exonerated when it was established that Kelley had perjured himself at the trial, as had FBI Special Agent H. Paul Rico, who had corroborated Kelley's testimony.

Kelley died 10 February 2000 of natural causes in the federal witness protection program.
