= 1962 Soviet nuclear tests =

Weapons testing

1962
- Nuclear blast animation

Information
- Country: Soviet Union
- Test site: Degelen, Semipalatinsk, Kazakhstan; Ground Zero, Semipalatinsk, Kazakhstan; Kola Peninsula Launch Area (Barents Sea); NZ Area C, Sukhoy Nos, Novaya Zemlya, Russia
- Period: 1962
- Number of tests: 78
- Test type: air drop, atmospheric, cruise missile, dry surface, high alt rocket (30–80 km), tower, tunnel
- Max. yield: 24.2 megatonnes of TNT (101 PJ)

Test series chronology

The Soviet Union's 1962 nuclear test series was a group of 78 nuclear tests conducted in 1962. These tests followed the Soviet Project K nuclear tests series and preceded the 1964 Soviet nuclear tests series.

Soviet Union's 1962 series tests and detonations
Name (Note: The US, France and Great Britain have code-named their test events, while the USSR and China did not, and therefore have only test numbers (with some exceptions – Soviet peaceful explosions were named). Word translations into English in parentheses unless the name is a proper noun. A dash followed by a number indicates a member of a salvo event. The US also sometimes named the individual explosions in such a salvo test, which results in "name1 – 1(with name2)". If test is canceled or aborted, then the row data like date and location discloses the intended plans, where known.)	Date time (UT)	Local time zone (Note: To convert the UT time into standard local, add the number of hours in parentheses to the UT time; for local daylight saving time, add one additional hour. If the result is earlier than 00:00, add 24 hours and subtract 1 from the day; if it is 24:00 or later, subtract 24 hours and add 1 to the day. Historical time zone data obtained from the IANA time zone database.)	Location (Note: Rough place name and a latitude/longitude reference; for rocket-carried tests, the launch location is specified before the detonation location, if known. Some locations are extremely accurate; others (like airdrops and space blasts) may be quite inaccurate. "~" indicates a likely pro-forma rough location, shared with other tests in that same area.)	Elevation + height (Note: Elevation is the ground level at the point directly below the explosion relative to sea level; height is the additional distance added or subtracted by tower, balloon, shaft, tunnel, air drop or other contrivance. For rocket bursts the ground level is "N/A". In some cases it is not clear if the height is absolute or relative to ground, for example, Plumbbob/John. No number or units indicates the value is unknown, while "0" means zero. Sorting on this column is by elevation and height added together.)	Delivery, (Note: Atmospheric, airdrop, balloon, gun, cruise missile, rocket, surface, tower, and barge are all disallowed by the Partial Nuclear Test Ban Treaty. Sealed shaft and tunnel are underground, and remained useful under the PTBT. Intentional cratering tests are borderline; they occurred under the treaty, were sometimes protested, and generally overlooked if the test was declared to be a peaceful use.) Purpose (Note: Include weapons development, weapon effects, safety test, transport safety test, war, science, joint verification and industrial/peaceful, which may be further broken down.)	Device (Note: Designations for test items where known, "?" indicates some uncertainty about the preceding value, nicknames for particular devices in quotes. This category of information is often not officially disclosed.)	Yield (Note: Estimated energy yield in tons, kilotons, and megatons. A ton of TNT equivalent is defined as 4.184 gigajoules (1 gigacalorie).)	Fallout (Note: Radioactive emission to the atmosphere aside from prompt neutrons, where known. The measured species is only iodine-131 if mentioned, otherwise it is all species. No entry means unknown, probably none if underground and "all" if not; otherwise notation for whether measured on the site only or off the site, where known, and the measured amount of radioactivity released.)	References	Notes
143 Argon 1 (Joe 120)	2 February 1962 08:00:00.2	ALMT (6 hrs)	Degelen, Semipalatinsk, Kazakhstan: A-1 49.78198°N 77.99618°E	700 m (2,300 ft) +	tunnel, weapon effect		15 kt			First Soviet underground test.
144	1 August 1962	ALMT (6 hrs)	Ground Zero, Semipalatinsk, Kazakhstan ~ 50.4°N 77.8°E	N/A + 430 m (1,410 ft)	atmospheric, weapons development		2.4 kt			
145	3 August 1962	ALMT (6 hrs)	Ground Zero, Semipalatinsk, Kazakhstan ~ 50.4°N 77.8°E	N/A + 180 m (590 ft)	atmospheric, weapons development		1.6 kt			
146	4 August 1962	ALMT (6 hrs)	Ground Zero, Semipalatinsk, Kazakhstan ~ 50.4°N 77.8°E	N/A + 390 m (1,280 ft)	atmospheric, weapons development		3.8 kt			
147	5 August 1962 09:08:45.8	MSK (3 hrs)	NZ Area C, Sukhoy Nos, Novaya Zemlya, Russia 74.2°N 52.5°E	0 + 3,600 m (11,800 ft)	air drop, weapons development		21.1 Mt			
148	7 August 1962 03:00:??	ALMT (6 hrs)	Ground Zero, Semipalatinsk, Kazakhstan 50.456°N 77.773°E	280 m (920 ft) + 0	dry surface, weapons development		9.9 kt			
149	10 August 1962 09:00:??	MSK (3 hrs)	NZ Area C, Sukhoy Nos, Novaya Zemlya, Russia ~ 73°N 55°E	0 + 1,560 m (5,120 ft)	air drop, weapons development		400 kt			
150	18 August 1962	ALMT (6 hrs)	Ground Zero, Semipalatinsk, Kazakhstan ~ 50.4°N 77.8°E	280 m (920 ft) + 710 m (2,330 ft)	air drop, weapons development		7.4 kt			
151	18 August 1962	ALMT (6 hrs)	Ground Zero, Semipalatinsk, Kazakhstan ~ 50.4°N 77.8°E	N/A + 310 m (1,020 ft)	atmospheric, weapons development		5.8 kt			
152	20 August 1962 09:02:14.1	MSK (3 hrs)	NZ Area C, Sukhoy Nos, Novaya Zemlya, Russia 74.3°N 51.5°E	0 + 2,500 m (8,200 ft)	air drop, weapons development		2.8 Mt			Khalturin names this an ICBM test from Chita.
153	21 August 1962	ALMT (6 hrs)	Ground Zero, Semipalatinsk, Kazakhstan ~ 50.4°N 77.8°E	280 m (920 ft) + 590 m (1,940 ft)	air drop, weapons development		23 kt			
156	22 August 1962	ALMT (6 hrs)	Ground Zero, Semipalatinsk, Kazakhstan ~ 50.4°N 77.8°E	280 m (920 ft) + 740 m (2,430 ft)	air drop, weapons development		3 kt			
155 Shkval (Flurry)	22 August 1962 09:00:00	MSK (3 hrs)	Launch from Kola Peninsula Launch Area (Barents Sea) 73.71°N 45.2°E, elv: 0 + 2,000 m (0 + 6,562 ft); Detonation over Kola Peninsula Launch Area (Barents Sea) ~ 73.75°N 52.3°E	0 + 60 m (200 ft)	cruise missile, weapons development		6 kt			Air launched (from TU-16K) cruise missile test. No other information on launch; trajectory is a guess. Location known only as "Kara Sea"; lat/lon a guess; official lat/lon is in NZ land corral.
154	22 August 1962 09:00:04.2	MSK (3 hrs)	NZ Area C, Sukhoy Nos, Novaya Zemlya, Russia 70.9917°N 55.52855°E	0 + 1,700 m (5,600 ft)	air drop, weapons development		1.6 Mt			
157	23 August 1962	ALMT (6 hrs)	Ground Zero, Semipalatinsk, Kazakhstan ~ 50.4°N 77.8°E	280 m (920 ft) + 680 m (2,230 ft)	air drop, weapons development		2.5 kt			
159	25 August 1962 05:40:??	ALMT (6 hrs)	Ground Zero, Semipalatinsk, Kazakhstan ~ 50.4°N 77.8°E	280 m (920 ft) + 715 m (2,346 ft)	air drop, weapons development		1 kt			
158	25 August 1962 09:??:??	MSK (3 hrs)	NZ Area C, Sukhoy Nos, Novaya Zemlya, Russia ~ 73°N 55°E	0 + 2,980 m (9,780 ft)	air drop,		10 Mt			
161	27 August 1962	ALMT (6 hrs)	Ground Zero, Semipalatinsk, Kazakhstan ~ 50.4°N 77.8°E	280 m (920 ft) + 245 m (804 ft)	air drop, weapons development		11 kt			
160	27 August 1962 09:00:50.9	MSK (3 hrs)	NZ Area C, Sukhoy Nos, Novaya Zemlya, Russia 74.7°N 50.3°E	0 + 3,000 m (9,800 ft)	air drop, weapons development		4.2 Mt			
162	31 August 1962	ALMT (6 hrs)	Ground Zero, Semipalatinsk, Kazakhstan ~ 50.4°N 77.8°E	280 m (920 ft) + 700 m (2,300 ft)	air drop, fundamental science		2.7 kt			
163	2 September 1962	MSK (3 hrs)	NZ Area C, Sukhoy Nos, Novaya Zemlya, Russia ~ 73°N 55°E	0 + 1,300 m (4,300 ft)	air drop, weapons development		80 kt			
unnumbered #4	6 September 1962	ALMT (6 hrs)	Ground Zero, Semipalatinsk, Kazakhstan ~ 50.4°N 77.8°E	280 m (920 ft) +	atmospheric,		less than 0.001 kt			
164 Tyulpan (Tulip)	8 September 1962 10:17:57.7	MSK (3 hrs)	Launch from Zabaykalsky (then Chita), Russia 51.91335°N 113.13053°E, elv: 685 + 0 m (2,247 + 0 ft); Detonation over NZ Area C, Sukhoy Nos, Novaya Zemlya, Russia 73.7°N 53.8°E	N/A + 1,725 m (5,659 ft)	high alt rocket (30–80 km), weapons development		1.9 Mt			Launched on an R-14 rocket from "Yasnaya railroad station" south of Chita toward Mityushikha Bay, NZ, 3600 km across Siberia. Probable ABM test.
165	15 September 1962 08:02:13.9	MSK (3 hrs)	NZ Area C, Sukhoy Nos, Novaya Zemlya, Russia 74.4°N 51.5°E	0 + 2,250 m (7,380 ft)	air drop, weapons development		3.1 Mt			
166	16 September 1962 10:59:10.5	MSK (3 hrs)	NZ Area C, Sukhoy Nos, Novaya Zemlya, Russia 74.2°N 51.6°E	0 + 2,250 m (7,380 ft)	air drop, weapons development		3.3 Mt			
unnumbered #5	18 September 1962	ALMT (6 hrs)	Ground Zero, Semipalatinsk, Kazakhstan ~ 50.4°N 77.8°E	280 m (920 ft) +	atmospheric,		10 kt			
167	18 September 1962 08:29:02.7	MSK (3 hrs)	NZ Area C, Sukhoy Nos, Novaya Zemlya, Russia 73.2°N 54.7°E	0 + 2,000 m (6,600 ft)	air drop, weapons development		1.4 Mt			
168	19 September 1962 11:00:56.4	MSK (3 hrs)	NZ Area C, Sukhoy Nos, Novaya Zemlya, Russia 73.8°N 53.8°E	0 + 3,280 m (10,760 ft)	air drop, weapons development		10 Mt			
169	21 September 1962 08:00:??	MSK (3 hrs)	NZ Area C, Sukhoy Nos, Novaya Zemlya, Russia ~ 73°N 55°E	0 + 3,000 m (9,800 ft)	air drop, weapons development		2.4 Mt			
170	22 September 1962	ALMT (6 hrs)	Ground Zero, Semipalatinsk, Kazakhstan 50.416°N 77.74°E	280 m (920 ft) + 0	dry surface, safety experiment		210 t			
171	24 September 1962	ALMT (6 hrs)	Ground Zero, Semipalatinsk, Kazakhstan ~ 50.4°N 77.8°E	280 m (920 ft) + 630 m (2,070 ft)	air drop, weapons development		1.2 kt			
172	25 September 1962	ALMT (6 hrs)	Ground Zero, Semipalatinsk, Kazakhstan 50.456°N 77.773°E	280 m (920 ft) + 0	dry surface, weapons development		7 kt			
173	25 September 1962 13:02:31.7	MSK (3 hrs)	NZ Area C, Sukhoy Nos, Novaya Zemlya, Russia 73.7°N 55°E	0 + 4,090 m (13,420 ft)	air drop, weapons development		19.1 Mt			
174	27 September 1962 08:03:16.4	MSK (3 hrs)	NZ Area C, Sukhoy Nos, Novaya Zemlya, Russia 74.3°N 52.4°E	0 + 3,900 m (12,800 ft)	air drop, weapons development		20 Mt			
175	28 September 1962	ALMT (6 hrs)	Ground Zero, Semipalatinsk, Kazakhstan ~ 50.4°N 77.8°E	280 m (920 ft) + 695 m (2,280 ft)	air drop, fundamental science		1.3 kt			
176	7 October 1962 16:32:??	MSK (3 hrs)	NZ Area C, Sukhoy Nos, Novaya Zemlya, Russia ~ 73°N 55°E	0 + 1,440 m (4,720 ft)	air drop, weapons development		320 kt			
177	9 October 1962	ALMT (6 hrs)	Ground Zero, Semipalatinsk, Kazakhstan ~ 50.4°N 77.8°E	280 m (920 ft) + 645 m (2,116 ft)	air drop, weapons development		8 kt			
178	9 October 1962	MSK (3 hrs)	NZ Area C, Sukhoy Nos, Novaya Zemlya, Russia ~ 73°N 55°E	0 + 3,000 m (9,800 ft)	air drop, weapons development		15 kt			
179	10 October 1962	ALMT (6 hrs)	Ground Zero, Semipalatinsk, Kazakhstan ~ 50.4°N 77.8°E	280 m (920 ft) + 665 m (2,182 ft)	air drop, weapons development		9.2 kt			
180	13 October 1962	ALMT (6 hrs)	Ground Zero, Semipalatinsk, Kazakhstan ~ 50.4°N 77.8°E	280 m (920 ft) + 720 m (2,360 ft)	air drop, weapons development		4.9 kt			
181	14 October 1962	ALMT (6 hrs)	Ground Zero, Semipalatinsk, Kazakhstan ~ 50.4°N 77.8°E	280 m (920 ft) + 725 m (2,379 ft)	air drop, weapons development		10 kt			
182	20 October 1962	ALMT (6 hrs)	Ground Zero, Semipalatinsk, Kazakhstan ~ 50.4°N 77.8°E	280 m (920 ft) + 635 m (2,083 ft)	air drop, weapons development		6.7 kt			
183	22 October 1962 09:06:10.1	MSK (3 hrs)	NZ Area C, Sukhoy Nos, Novaya Zemlya, Russia 73.4°N 54.9°E	0 + 3,230 m (10,600 ft)	air drop, weapons development		8.2 Mt			
185	27 October 1962 07:35:??	MSK (3 hrs)	NZ Area C, Sukhoy Nos, Novaya Zemlya, Russia ~ 73°N 55°E	0 + 1,550 m (5,090 ft)	air drop, weapons development		260 kt			
186	28 October 1962	ALMT (6 hrs)	Ground Zero, Semipalatinsk, Kazakhstan ~ 50.4°N 77.8°E	280 m (920 ft) + 670 m (2,200 ft)	air drop, weapons development		7.8 kt			
188	28 October 1962	ALMT (6 hrs)	Ground Zero, Semipalatinsk, Kazakhstan ~ 50.4°N 77.8°E	280 m (920 ft) + 645 m (2,116 ft)	air drop, weapons development		7.8 kt			
189	29 October 1962 07:35:??	MSK (3 hrs)	NZ Area C, Sukhoy Nos, Novaya Zemlya, Russia ~ 73°N 55°E	0 + 1,550 m (5,090 ft)	air drop, weapons development		360 kt			
190	30 October 1962	ALMT (6 hrs)	Ground Zero, Semipalatinsk, Kazakhstan ~ 50.4°N 77.8°E	280 m (920 ft) + 0	dry surface, weapons development		1.2 kt			
191	30 October 1962	MSK (3 hrs)	NZ Area C, Sukhoy Nos, Novaya Zemlya, Russia ~ 73°N 55°E	0 + 1,500 m (4,900 ft)	air drop, weapons development		280 kt			
192	31 October 1962	ALMT (6 hrs)	Ground Zero, Semipalatinsk, Kazakhstan ~ 50.4°N 77.8°E	280 m (920 ft) + 690 m (2,260 ft)	air drop, weapons development		10 kt			
194	1 November 1962 06:30:??	MSK (3 hrs)	NZ Area C, Sukhoy Nos, Novaya Zemlya, Russia ~ 73°N 55°E	0 + 1,500 m (4,900 ft)	air drop, weapons development		240 kt			
193	1 November 1962 09:20:??	ALMT (6 hrs)	Ground Zero, Semipalatinsk, Kazakhstan ~ 50.4°N 77.8°E	280 m (920 ft) + 700 m (2,300 ft)	air drop, weapons development		3 kt			
197	3 November 1962	MSK (3 hrs)	NZ Area C, Sukhoy Nos, Novaya Zemlya, Russia ~ 73°N 55°E	0 + 4,000 m (13,000 ft)	air drop, weapons development		45 kt			
198	3 November 1962	ALMT (6 hrs)	Ground Zero, Semipalatinsk, Kazakhstan ~ 50.4°N 77.8°E	280 m (920 ft) + 710 m (2,330 ft)	air drop, weapons development		4.7 kt			
196	3 November 1962 08:31:??	MSK (3 hrs)	NZ Area C, Sukhoy Nos, Novaya Zemlya, Russia ~ 73°N 55°E	0 + 1,500 m (4,900 ft)	air drop, weapons development		390 kt			
199	4 November 1962	ALMT (6 hrs)	Ground Zero, Semipalatinsk, Kazakhstan ~ 50.4°N 77.8°E	280 m (920 ft) + 600 m (2,000 ft)	air drop, weapons development		8.4 kt			
200	5 November 1962	ALMT (6 hrs)	Ground Zero, Semipalatinsk, Kazakhstan 50.43°N 77.83°E	280 m (920 ft) + 15 m (49 ft)	tower, weapon effect		400 t			
201	11 November 1962	ALMT (6 hrs)	Ground Zero, Semipalatinsk, Kazakhstan 50.416°N 77.74°E	280 m (920 ft) + 8 m (26 ft)	tower, weapons development		100 t			
202	13 November 1962	ALMT (6 hrs)	Ground Zero, Semipalatinsk, Kazakhstan ~ 50.378°N 77.855°E	280 m (920 ft) + 0	dry surface, weapons development		1000 kg			
203	14 November 1962	ALMT (6 hrs)	Ground Zero, Semipalatinsk, Kazakhstan ~ 50.4°N 77.8°E	280 m (920 ft) + 660 m (2,170 ft)	air drop, weapons development		12 kt			
204	17 November 1962	ALMT (6 hrs)	Ground Zero, Semipalatinsk, Kazakhstan ~ 50.4°N 77.8°E	280 m (920 ft) + 715 m (2,346 ft)	air drop, weapons development		18 kt			
205	24 November 1962	ALMT (6 hrs)	Ground Zero, Semipalatinsk, Kazakhstan ~ 50.378°N 77.855°E	280 m (920 ft) + 0	dry surface, safety experiment		1000 kg			
206	26 November 1962	ALMT (6 hrs)	Ground Zero, Semipalatinsk, Kazakhstan ~ 50.378°N 77.855°E	280 m (920 ft) + 0	dry surface, safety experiment		31 t			
207	1 December 1962	ALMT (6 hrs)	Ground Zero, Semipalatinsk, Kazakhstan ~ 50.4°N 77.8°E	280 m (920 ft) + 680 m (2,230 ft)	air drop, weapons development		2.4 kt			
209	18 December 1962	MSK (3 hrs)	NZ Area C, Sukhoy Nos, Novaya Zemlya, Russia ~ 73°N 55°E	0 + 1,500 m (4,900 ft)	air drop, fundamental science		69 kt			
208	18 December 1962 10:45:??	MSK (3 hrs)	NZ Area C, Sukhoy Nos, Novaya Zemlya, Russia ~ 73°N 55°E	0 + 1,600 m (5,200 ft)	air drop, weapons development		110 kt			
210	20 December 1962	MSK (3 hrs)	NZ Area C, Sukhoy Nos, Novaya Zemlya, Russia ~ 73°N 55°E	0 + 1,070 m (3,510 ft)	air drop, weapons development		8.3 kt			
211	22 December 1962	MSK (3 hrs)	NZ Area C, Sukhoy Nos, Novaya Zemlya, Russia ~ 73°N 55°E	0 + 1,050 m (3,440 ft)	air drop, weapons development		6.3 kt			
213	23 December 1962	MSK (3 hrs)	NZ Area C, Sukhoy Nos, Novaya Zemlya, Russia ~ 73°N 55°E	0 + 1,470 m (4,820 ft)	air drop, weapons development		8.3 kt			
214	23 December 1962	MSK (3 hrs)	NZ Area C, Sukhoy Nos, Novaya Zemlya, Russia ~ 73°N 55°E	0 + 1,270 m (4,170 ft)	air drop, weapons development		2.4 kt			
215	23 December 1962	ALMT (6 hrs)	Ground Zero, Semipalatinsk, Kazakhstan ~ 50.378°N 77.855°E	280 m (920 ft) + 0	dry surface, safety experiment		less than 0.001 kt			
212	23 December 1962 11:15:??	MSK (3 hrs)	NZ Area C, Sukhoy Nos, Novaya Zemlya, Russia ~ 73°N 55°E	0 + 1,460 m (4,790 ft)	air drop, weapons development		430 kt			
216	24 December 1962	ALMT (6 hrs)	Ground Zero, Semipalatinsk, Kazakhstan ~ 50.378°N 77.855°E	280 m (920 ft) + 0	dry surface, safety experiment		7 t			
217	24 December 1962	ALMT (6 hrs)	Ground Zero, Semipalatinsk, Kazakhstan ~ 50.378°N 77.855°E	280 m (920 ft) + 0	dry surface, safety experiment		28 t			
218	24 December 1962 10:44:21.9	MSK (3 hrs)	NZ Area C, Sukhoy Nos, Novaya Zemlya, Russia 74.2°N 52.3°E	0 + 1,320 m (4,330 ft)	air drop, weapons development		1.1 Mt			
219	24 December 1962 11:11:42.0	MSK (3 hrs)	NZ Area C, Sukhoy Nos, Novaya Zemlya, Russia 73.6°N 57.5°E	0 + 3,750 m (12,300 ft)	air drop, weapons development		24.2 Mt			Reduced yield test of 50 Mt weapon.
220	25 December 1962 13:35:57.2	MSK (3 hrs)	NZ Area C, Sukhoy Nos, Novaya Zemlya, Russia 73.4°N 56.5°E	0 + 2,250 m (7,380 ft)	air drop, weapons development		3.1 Mt			
221	25 December 1962	MSK (3 hrs)	NZ Area C, Sukhoy Nos, Novaya Zemlya, Russia ~ 73°N 55°E	0 + 990 m (3,250 ft)	air drop, weapons development		8.5 kt			Last Soviet atmospheric test.
