= Franz Schrönghamer-Heimdal =

Bavarian Catholic writer and painter

Franz Schrönghamer-Heimdal (born July 12, 1881, in Marbach Eppenschlag, Lower Bavaria - died 3 September 1962 in Passau), was a Bavarian Catholic writer and painter.

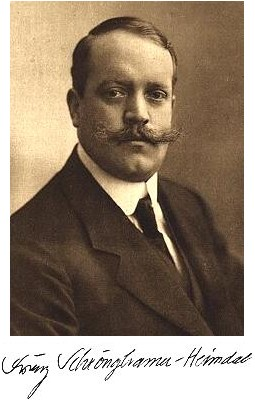
