= Nungua Senior High School =

Senior High School

- Greater Accra Region; Nungua; Ghana

Information
- Motto: PER ARDUA AD ALTA
- Established: 1960
- Nickname: ABLADE
- Website: www.nunsec.com

The Nungua Senior High School is a second cycle institution found in the township of Nungua, Ghana. The school was set up to educate young graduates who have finished Junior High School (JHS). The school was built by the government of Ghana.

== History ==
Nungua Senior High School was conceived to be established as the first secondary school in Nungua in the year 1960 by Nii Quaye Tawiah, popularly known as Quaye Nungua, a prominent entrepreneur and significant son of the town.

In that very year, his 15-year-old son, Master Enoch Otu Quaye, who was schooling in Presbyterian Secondary School, Odumase Krobo had to be recalled home and installed as a Chief of Nungua. The demand of this new role required that this young Chief would have to stay at Nungua to readily avail himself of Chieftaincy duties. However, the young lad was consumed by a desire for academic achievement and petitioned to be allowed to continue and complete his Secondary education.

His father agreed, but rather than sending him back to Krobo Odumase to continue his schooling, he decided to establish a local Secondary School at Nungua where his son could pursue his academic studies and also be readily available for chieftaincy affairs and duties. Within two years of his resolve, Quaye Nungua had converted into a Secondary School, his multi-unit building complex on his then large residential compound, equipped with its own generator which was the only one in the town then. Thus began the journey of the first secondary school ever to be established in the Nungua Township.
