= Tawia Adamafio =

Ghanaian minister

Minister for Presidential Affairs
- In office 1961–?
- President: Kwame Nkrumah

Minister for Information and Broadcasting
- In office 1960–1962
- President: Kwame Nkrumah
- Preceded by: Position established
- Succeeded by: L. R. Abavana

Personal details
- Born: 1911
- Died: 1994 (aged 82–83)
- Party: Convention People's Party

Tawia Adamafio (born Joseph Tawia Adams; 1911 – 1994) was a Ghanaian politician, who served as a government minister under Kwame Nkrumah.

== Biography ==
Adamafio was born Joseph Tawia Adams, but Africanized his name in 1946, while working as a clerk for the Supreme Court in Accra. A leading member of the Convention People's Party (CPP), he travelled to England to pursue law studies in 1956; there, he organized the National Association of Socialist Students Organization (NASSO) to support the CPP from London. Upon his return to Accra, he rose to become general-secretary of the CPP. In 1960 he was named minister for information and broadcasting in the Nkrumah government, and the following year he was appointed to the influential position of minister for presidential affairs.

After an attempt on Nkrumah's life in August 1962, Adamafio was detained along with minister of foreign affairs Ako Adjei and H. H. Cofie-Crabbe, the executive secretary of the CPP. The three were acquitted following a trial, led by chief justice Kobina Arku Korsah along with the two Supreme Court judges William Van Lare and Edward Akufo-Addo, which lasted from September to November 1963. The acquittal was harshly criticized by Nkrumah; he responded by sacking Korsah, while Van Lare and Akufo-Addo resigned from the Supreme Court. After constitutional amendments, a new trial was help before a pro-government panel in March 1964, where all three were sentenced to death. Nkrumah later commuted their sentences to life imprisonment.

Adamafio was released from prison after the 1966 coup d'état which overthrew Nkrumah. He returned to political favor after the military took power in the 1972 coup d'état, and supported the concept of union government (UNIGOV) proposed by the Supreme Military Council in a 1978 referendum.

== Bibliography ==
- Adamafio, Tawia (1960). A Portrait of Osagyefo, Dr. Kwame Nkrumah, President of the Republic of Ghana, Broadcast by Hon. Tawia Adamafio, General Secretary of the C.P.P. on National Founder's Day, 21st September, 1960. Accra: Ministry of Information and Broadcasting.
- Adamafio, Tawia (1960). French Nuclear Tests in the Sahara. Accra: Convention People's Party. LCC U264.5.F8 A25 1960.
- Adamafio, Tawia (1982). By Nkrumah's Side: The Labour and the Wounds. Accra & London: Westcoast Publishing House. ISBN 978-0-86036-176-3.
