= Kulungugu =

Town in Upper East Region, Ghana

- Peri-urban area
- Location in Ghana
- Coordinates: 11°08′50″N 0°12′35″W
- Country: Ghana
- Region: Upper East Region
- District: Pusiga District
- Time zone: GMT
  - Summer (DST): GMT

Kulungugu is a small town in the Upper East Region of Ghana and a minor entry point at the border of Burkina Faso and the Pusiga District of Ghana.

Kulungugu takes its name from the Bissa Language. The founder of Kulungungu was a Bissa man who became the first chief of the town. He and his family were the first people to settle in the area. There was a crooked Shea nut tree not too far from where he built his house. Relatives and friends from elsewhere who would look for him, were told "to look out for the crooked Shea nut tree; once you see that tree, you will surely find his house, because his house is not far from there"

In Bissa, Shea nut is "kur" while the word Crooked is translated as "gunghu". Thus, "crooked Shea nut tree" in Bissa, is translated as "kur gunghu".

As more and more people came to settle with him and around him, they were referred to as the people at or near or around the kur gunghu. They themselves started calling themselves "kur gunghu people"

The settlement grew with the years and he was made chief of the kur gunghu people.

Government and other Institutions got interested in kur gunghu as it grew rapidly; but since they were unable to say kur gunghu, they corrupted it to Kulungungu.

The tree is no longer there, but people can point at the exact location back in the town.

Kulungugu is noted as the site of the 1962 Kulungugu bomb attack, a failed attempt to assassinate Ghana's first president, Dr. Kwame Nkrumah.
