= Alice Badiangana =

Congolese trade unionist

- Born: 1939 (age 86–87)
- Citizenship: Republic of the Congo
- Occupations: Trade unionist; politician

Alice Badiangana also Alice Badiangaba or Alice Mbadiangana, later Alice Mahoungou (born 1939) is a trade unionist and politician from the Republic of the Congo. She was the first Congolese woman to be held as a political prisoner, and was s co-founder of the Congolese Youth Union and a leader of the African Women's Union of the Congo.

== Biography ==
Badiangana was born in 1939 and attended a Catholic primary school in Brazzaville, studying for additional courses. Her level of education enabled her to get a job at the National Social Security Fund. She joined the local section of her branch (the GCAT) of the General Confederation of Labor (CGT), which was a union for workers in commerce and industry and had communist tendencies. Badiangana became the National Social Security Fund's union delegate.

In 1956, she co-founded the Congolese Youth Union (UJC), with Aimé Matsika and Julien Boukambou. She is one of the permanent members of the organization considered progressive. Badiangana was also one of the leaders of the African Women's Union of the Congo (UFAC), which was linked to the UJC. The goal of UFAC "is to bring together Congolese women from all regions of the country in order to make them aware of the problems facing the country and to work for a free, prosperous and better Congo". As a result of her connections with both organisations, in 1959 she travelled to Vienna for the World Festival of Youth and Students. Whilst with the UJC, Badiangana supported the independence movement for of Congo-Brazzaville.

== Imprisonment ==
In 1960, the Congolese government imprisoned 16 members of the CGAT and eight members of the UJC, under the pretext of a communist plot. Badiangana was the only woman. The CGT instructed one of its lawyers, Michel Bruguier, to defend the accused and demand their immediate release. They also benefited from the support of André Malraux, then the local representative of France, who intervened with President Fulbert Youlou to ask him to organize a trial. Her imprisonment that Badiangana was the first Congolese woman political prisoner, prior to independence. Her trial was dismissed and she was released in September 1960, after six months in prison. While she was imprisoned, on 15 August 1960, Congo gained its independence. She returned to her job at the union, who are critical of the government's employment policy and working conditions.

== Revolution ==
In August 1963, Fulbert Youlou decided to create a single party with an affiliated union, in order to control his opponents. In response to this all the unions called for a general strike on 13 August 1963. This precipitated what became known as the Trois Glorieuses, where from 13 to 15 August 1963 trade unionists led an uprising, which led to the deposition of Youlou. During the demonstrations, Badiangana threw back a hand grenade sent into the crowd by the army.

Badiangana took part in the debates to build a new constitution under the new president, Alphonse Massamba-Débat. She was co-opted to sit on the central committee of the single party, the National Movement of the Revolution (MNR), set up in 1964. As a result of her work with the UJC she was appointed treasurer to the MNR. She was then only 24 years old. Along with the ten other members, she influenced the regime's policy for five years. Also in 1964, the National Revolutionary Movement imposed the reorganisation of all women's associations into a single organization - the Democratic Union of Women of Congo (UDFC). This was replaced the following year, in 1965, by the Revolutionary Union of Congolese Women (URFC) which dealt with women's issues until the sovereign national conference in 1991.

In 1968, after Marien Ngouabi took power, Badiangana was dismissed from her post. However, she continued to engage in political activities. She was a member of the Congolese Labour Party from 1972 until the National Conference in 1991. She also served as a Central Committee member of the Congolese Party of Labour (P.C.T) between 1972 and 1991. During the transition, she was one of five National Assembly members that were included in the National Conference (and the sole woman in the National Assembly delegation). She also served as second secretary of the National People's Assembly.

== Legacy ==
Badiangana's life and impact has been the subject of research by historian Scholastique Dianzinga.

=== In film ===
Badiangana participated as narrator in the film Revolutionary(s) by Hassim Tall Boukambou (2001), which traced the political history of Congo-Brazzaville through the story of the revolution of August 1963.
