= June 1963 =

Month of 1963

<<	June 1963					>>
Su	Mo	Tu	We	Th	Fr	Sa
						1
2	3	4	5	6	7	8
9	10	11	12	13	14	15
16	17	18	19	20	21	22
23	24	25	26	27	28	29
30

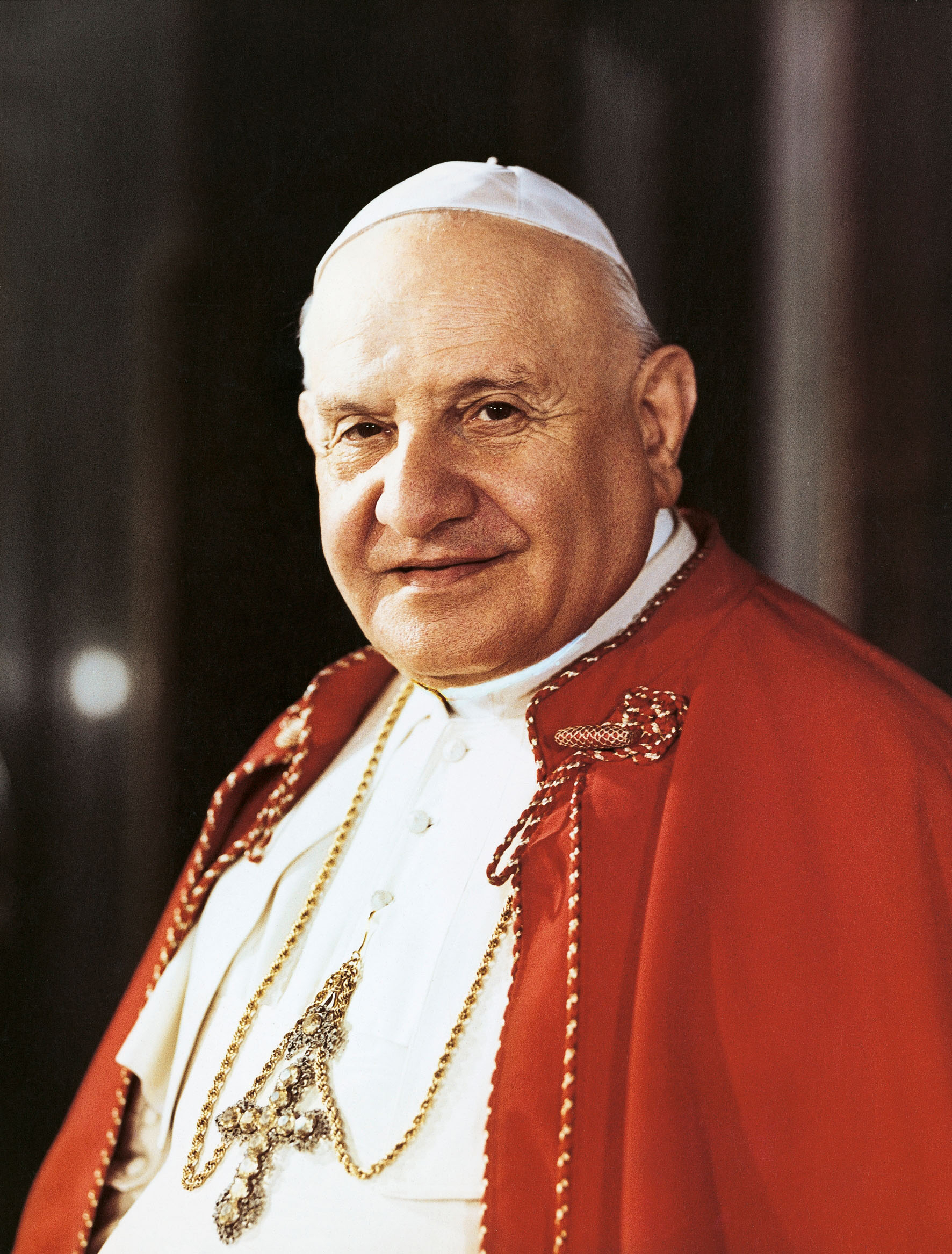
June 3, 1963: Pope John XXIII dies of cancer

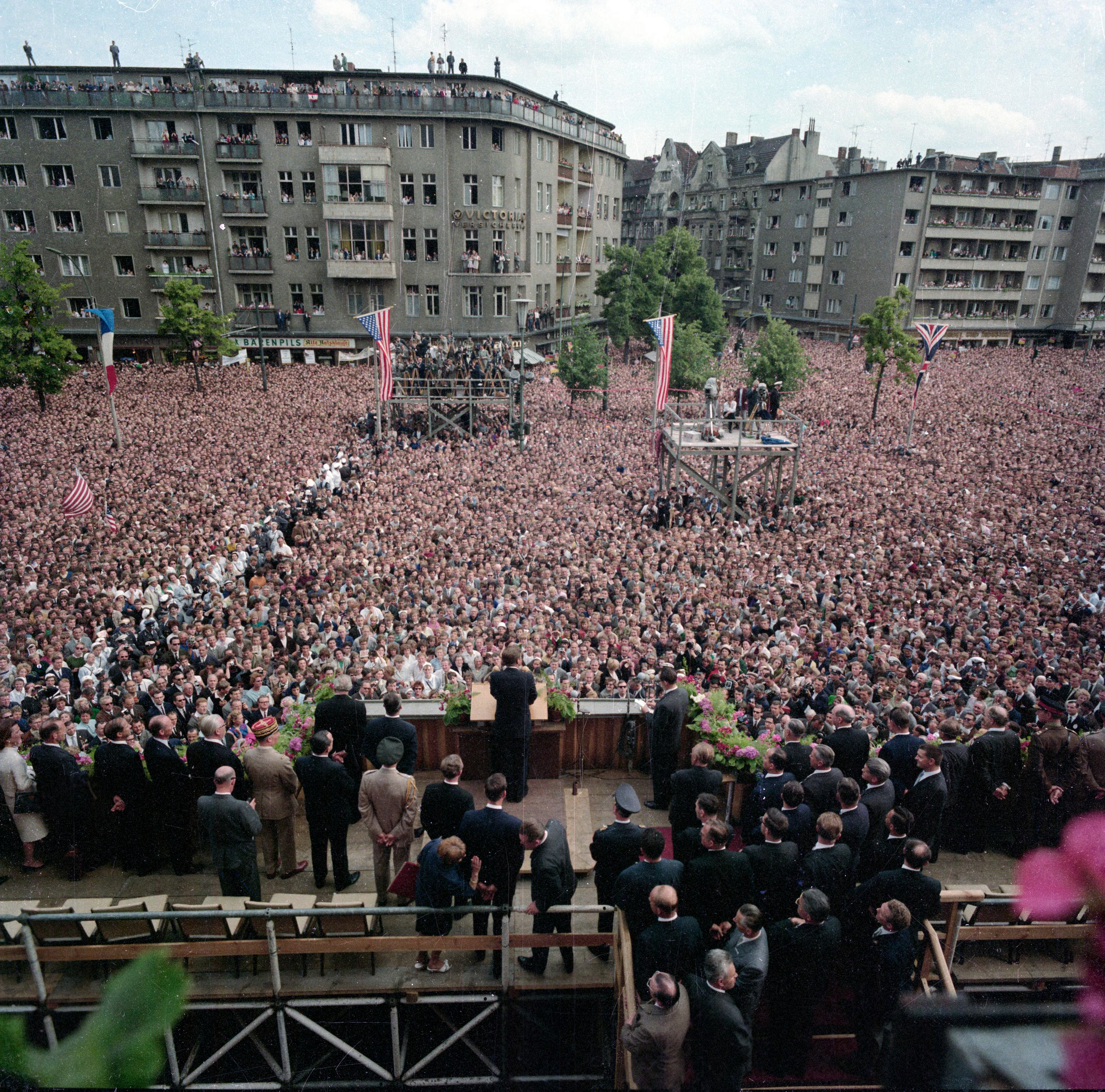
June 26, 1963: U.S. President Kennedy tells the world "Ich bin ein Berliner"

The following events occurred in June 1963:

== June 1, 1963 (Saturday) ==
- Willie Pastrano, a 6 to 1 underdog challenger, won the world light heavyweight boxing championship, defeating titleholder Harold Johnson. Although most sportswriters thought that Johnson had won the 15-round bout in Las Vegas, Pastrano was declared the winner by the judges in a 2 to 1 decision. "I'm not saying that the underworld dictated the decision," Johnson's manager told reporters afterward, "but the betting was 5–1 and 6–1 for my boy? What do you think?"
- Manned Spacecraft Center (MSC) announced two space station study contracts to compare concepts for a 24-person orbital laboratory: one with the Lockheed Aircraft Corporation and another with Douglas Aircraft Company, Inc., Missiles and Space Systems Division. The stations were to be designed for a useful orbital lifetime of about five years, with periodic resupply and crew rotations.
- In South Vietnam, President Ngô Đình Diệm's office announced the dismissal of the three major officials involved in the May 8 killing of eight Buddhists in Huế. The province chief and his deputy, and the government delegate for the Central Region of Vietnam were fired for failing to maintain order.
- Jomo Kenyatta was sworn in as the first Prime Minister of Kenya.

== June 2, 1963 (Sunday) ==
- Fred Lorenzen won the World 600 NASCAR race despite his car running out of gas on the final lap. Junior Johnson had been leading the race until suffering a blown tire with three laps left. Lorenzen's win brought his earnings to "just under $80,000 making him the biggest money winner in stock car racing history", even though the racing season was only half over.
- Stage I of Gemini launch vehicle 1 was erected in Martin-Baltimore's vertical test facility. Stage II would follow on June 9, and inspection was completed June 12. Subsystem Functional Verification Tests began June 10.
- Born: Anand Abhyankar, Indian Marathi actor (d. 2012); in Nagpur, Maharashtra

== June 3, 1963 (Monday) ==
- All 101 people aboard Northwest Airlines Flight 293 were killed when the Douglas DC-7, crashed into the Pacific Ocean west-southwest of Annette Island, Alaska, off the coast of British Columbia. Chartered to carry U.S. military personnel and their families from McChord Air Force Base in Washington, to Elmendorf Air Force Base in Alaska, the plane disappeared shortly after being cleared to climb to an altitude of 18,000 feet (5,500 m). Forty-seven years later, the cause of the accident remained unknown and the wreckage of the airplane remained "under more than 8,000 feet of water in the Gulf of Alaska".
- At Huế, South Vietnamese soldiers poured caustic chemicals on the heads of Buddhist protesters, and 67 people were injured. The United States' threat of the halting of aid to President Ngo Dinh Diem's regime was sufficient to lead the military to conclude that Diem could be overthrown without an intervention from the U.S.
- Born: John Kirby, coordinator for Strategic Communications at the National Security Council in the White House since 2022
- Died:
  - Pope John XXIII, 81, Italian Pontiff of the Roman Catholic Church. As Cardinal Angelo Giuseppe Roncalli, he had been the Patriarch of Venice when elected on October 28, 1958, to succeed Pope Pius XII. The Pope's death from stomach cancer, complicated by peritonitis, happened at 7:49 p.m. in Rome, leaving the papacy sede vacante.
  - Nazim Hikmet, 61, Turkish poet, died of a heart attack while picking up a morning newspaper at the door at his summer house in Peredelkino in the Soviet Union.

== June 4, 1963 (Tuesday) ==
- The Ayatollah Ruhollah Khomeini, religious leader of Iran's Shi'ite Muslim community, was arrested in the city of Qom after speaking against the emancipation of women in the regime of Shah Mohammad Reza Pahlavi. Khomeini would be imprisoned for eight months, and released in April 1964. Six months later, he would be arrested again and sent into exile in Turkey, then move the following year to Najaf, in Iraq. In 1979, Khomeini would lead the overthrow of the monarchy and the establishment of the Islamic Republic of Iran.
- U.S. President John F. Kennedy signed Executive Order 11110, delegating authority to the U.S. Secretary of the Treasury to issue silver certificates under the Thomas Amendment to the Agricultural Adjustment Act.
- Robert Wesley Patch, a six-year-old boy from Chevy Chase, Maryland, was awarded United States Patent No. 3,091,888 for a toy truck that could be "readily assembled and disassembled by a child".
- Australian diver Max Cramer became the first person to dive to the wreckage of the ship Batavia, exactly 334 years after the Dutch vessel had sunk on June 4, 1629.
- At a meeting of the Gemini Abort Panel, McDonnell Aircraft Corporation recommended dropping the lower limit for aborting a mission to 35,000 feet (11,000 m). The existing abort stages were Mode 1 (use of ejection seats up to 70,000 feet (21,000 m)); Mode 2 (booster shutdown and retrosalvo rockets between 70,000 feet (21,000 m) and 522,000 feet (159,000 m)); and Mode 3, booster shutdown and normal separation from above 522,000 feet (159,000 m) until the last few seconds of powered flight.
- Died: American footballer Don Fleming, 25, Cleveland Browns safety, was electrocuted along with a co-worker on a construction site near Orlando, Florida.

== June 5, 1963 (Wednesday) ==
- British Secretary of State for War John Profumo was forced to resign after revelations of an extramarital affair between him and Christine Keeler, and Profumo's subsequent admission that he had lied about the affair to his fellow MPs in the House of Commons.
- Political demonstrations began in Iran, protesting the arrest of Ayatollah Ruhollah Khomeini by the regime of Shah Mohammad Reza Pahlavi. The uprising coincided with the 10th of Muharam, an Islamic holiday marking the start of the new year, 1383 A.H., and the worldwide mourning for the Roman Catholic Pope. The martyrdom of Islamic clerics on that day, the 15th of Khordad, 1342 on the Persian calendar, is now commemorated as a public holiday in Iran.
- U.S. President Kennedy announced during a speech at the United States Air Force Academy that the United States government would team with private industry to quickly develop "the prototype of a commercially successful supersonic transport superior to that being built in any other country," a reference to the British-French Concorde and the Soviet Tupolev Tu-144. His statement would give rise to the Boeing 2707 ("SST") project.
- Afterwards, President Kennedy flew to El Paso, Texas, where he met U.S. Vice President Lyndon Johnson and Texas Governor John B. Connally, to discuss a presidential tour of Texas to take place in late November 1963, with stops in Dallas, Fort Worth, San Antonio and Houston.
- U.S. District Judge Seybourn H. Lynne of Alabama enjoined the state from blocking the enrollment of the University of Alabama's first two African-American students.
- Guinea's president Sékou Touré began a state visit to the Republic of the Congo, creating a political stir in the country.
- The first annual NHL draft was held in Montreal.
- Died: Lieutenant-General Adrian Carton de Wiart, 83, British Army officer who served in the Second Boer War, World War I, and World War II

== June 6, 1963 (Thursday) ==
- Communist Party Chairman Mao Zedong of the People's Republic of China Communist Party sent a letter to Soviet Premier Nikita Khrushchev, stating that "The Chinese people will never accept the privileged position of one or two superpowers" with a monopoly on nuclear weapons, and then gave the go ahead for China to accelerate its own nuclear program. China would explode its first atomic bomb on October 16, 1964.

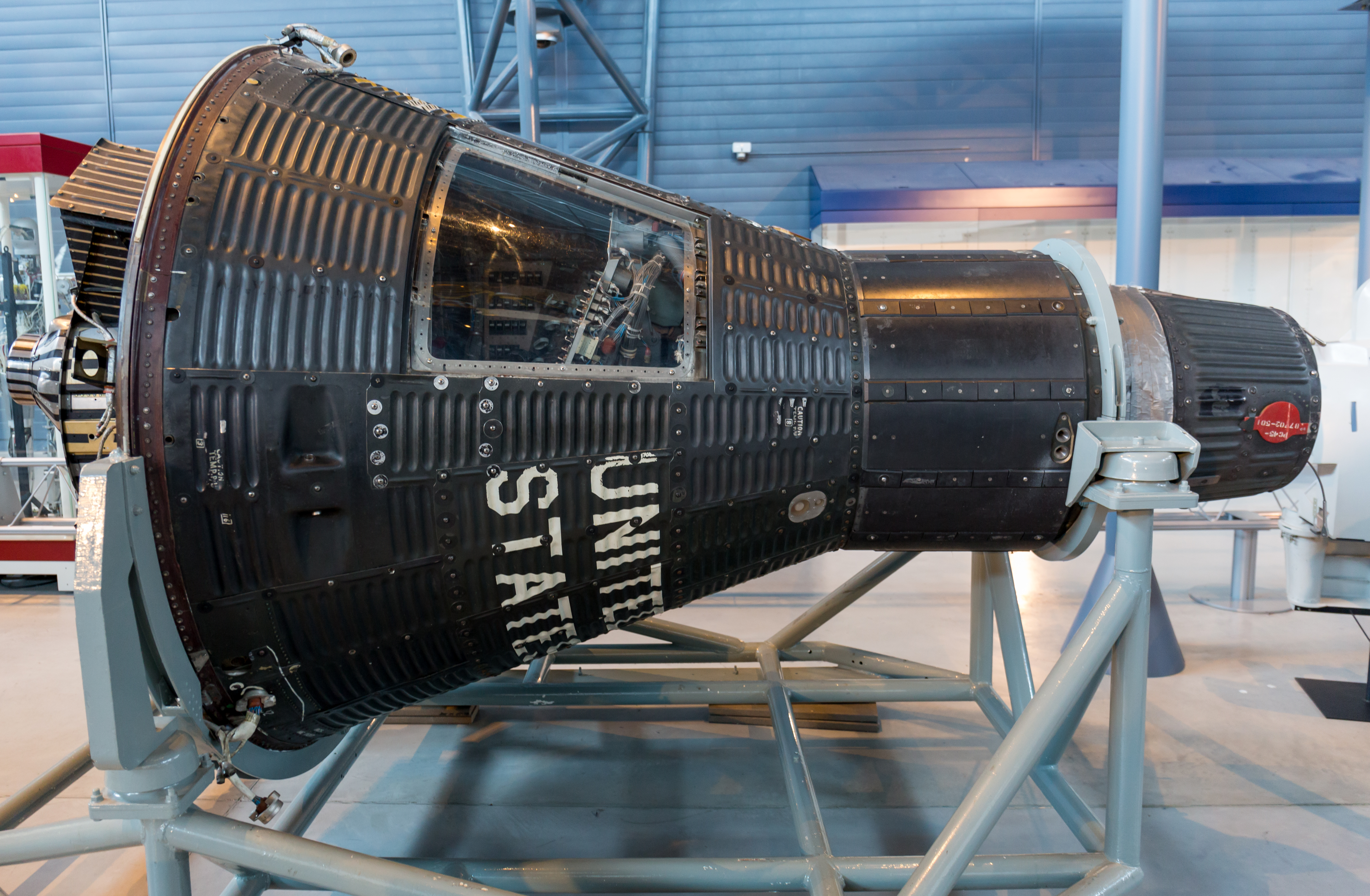
The unflown Mercury-Atlas 10 spacecraft

- Officials of NASA's Manned Spacecraft Center urged NASA to schedule a Mercury 10 mission, citing their belief that the Mercury spacecraft was capable of much longer missions than the 34-hour trip of Mercury 9 completed on May 16. Arguments that a mission of several days could be applied to the forthcoming Gemini and Apollo projects did not sway NASA. Another U.S. launch of a crew would not take place until 21 months later, with Gemini 3 on March 23, 1965.
- Andrew Kalitinsky, a spokesman for General Dynamics, told a gathering of scientists at the American Astronautical Society symposium in Denver that U.S. astronauts could be launched to the planet Mars as early as 1975. Kalitinsky spoke at the symposium "The Exploration of Mars", and envisioned that "a convoy of four multi-ton spaceships" would make the journey. The talk came the day after NASA announced its plan to send two satellites to Mars in November 1964 as the first step toward a crewed mission.
- Born: Jason Isaacs, English film actor; in Liverpool

== June 7, 1963 (Friday) ==
- The Rolling Stones' first single, "Come On", was released in the UK, by Decca Records. The cover of "an obscure Chuck Berry ditty" would reach #21 on the British chart.
- Died: ZaSu Pitts, 69, American actress

== June 8, 1963 (Saturday) ==
- The Army of Egypt, intervening in the North Yemen Civil War, made the first use of poison gas in warfare since World War II, dropping chemical weapons, believed to be phosgene, on the village of Al Kawma.
- The first Titan II nuclear intercontinental ballistic missiles became operational, with the activation by the U.S. at the Davis–Monthan Air Force Base near Tucson, Arizona.
- Representatives of NASA, the USAF Space Systems Division (SSD), The Aerospace Corporation, McDonnell Aircraft and Martin Aircraft met to investigate the structural integrity and compatibility of the Gemini spacecraft and the Gemini rocket. The contractors had been instructed to furnish all available structural data to NASA by July 15.
- Emile Griffith defeated Luis Manuel Rodríguez at Madison Square Garden to regain his welterweight boxing title for a third time. Rodriguez had defeated Griffith in a bout on March 31.
- The U.S. National Museum of Naval Aviation opened at Naval Air Station Pensacola in Pensacola, Florida.

== June 9, 1963 (Sunday) ==
- Fernando Belaúnde Terry was elected President of Peru in a repeat of the June 10, 1962 election that had been annulled by the military five weeks later. Belaúnde and the other two major candidates from 1962 ran again, receiving 708,931 votes, 39% of those cast and more than the one-third required under the Peruvian Constitution. Víctor Raúl Haya de la Torre, who had won a plurality in 1962, got only 34.3% (623,532) and Manuel A. Odría 25.5% (463,325).
- In elections for Mongolia's parliament, the Mongolian People's Republic Party, sole legal political party in the Communist nation, won 216 of the 270 seats. The remaining 54 seats went to non-party candidates.
- Born: Johnny Depp, American film actor; in Owensboro, Kentucky
- Died: Jacques Villon, 87, French Cubist painter

== June 10, 1963 (Monday) ==
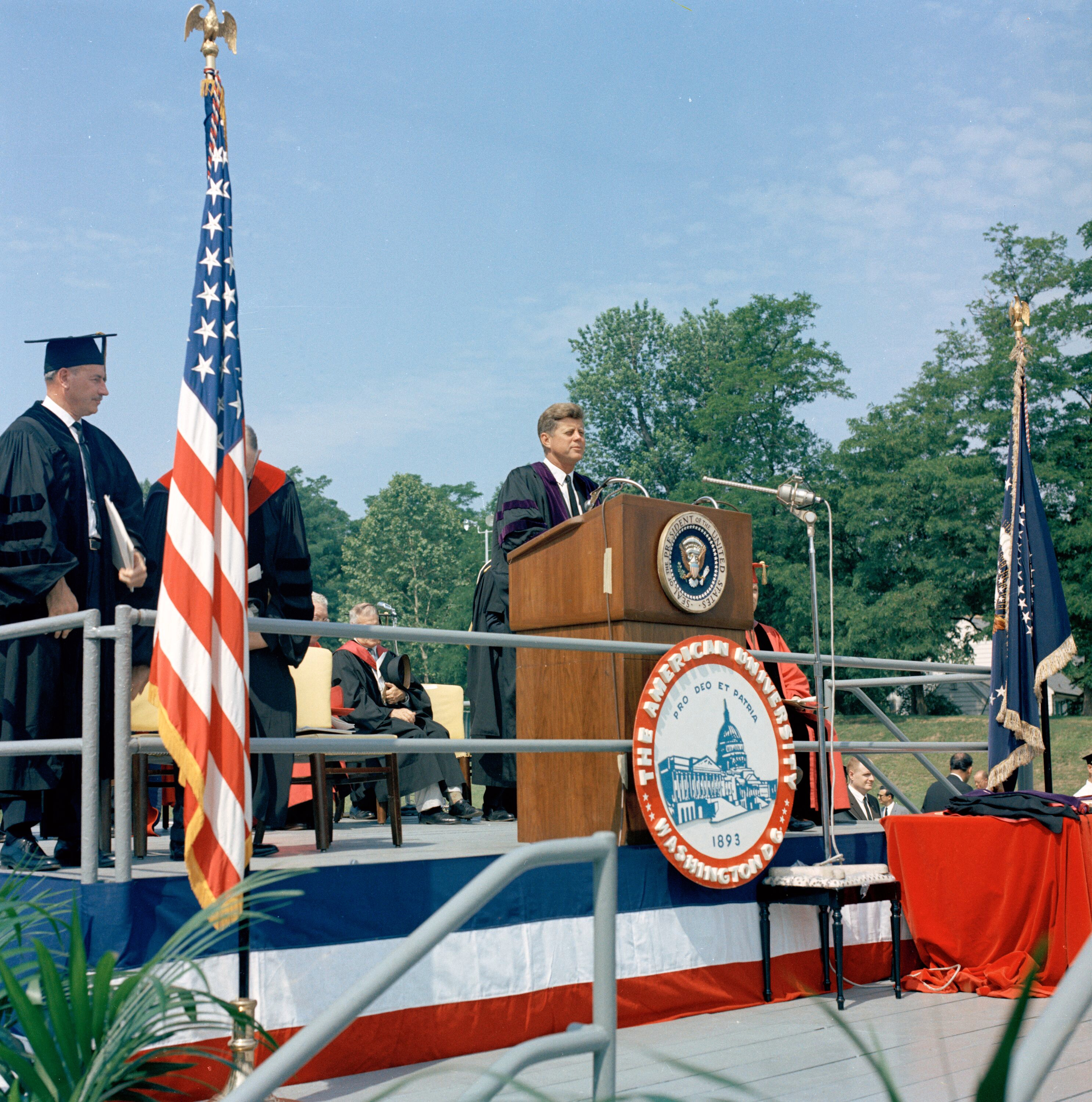
June 10, 1963: President Kennedy delivering his commencement address

- U.S. President Kennedy announced the suspension of nuclear testing during his commencement address at American University in Washington, D.C., along with the administration's plan to work towards a nuclear test-ban treaty with the Soviet Union and other atomic powers.
- Florida Governor C. Farris Bryant signed Senate Bill 125 into law, establishing the University of Central Florida. On January 24, the Board of Controls would select land near the Orange County town of Alafaya, Florida, for the construction of the new campus, and the university would begin classes, under the name Florida Technological University (FTU), on November 1, 1968.
- Twelve people, nine of whom were Explorer Scouts from Provo, Utah, were killed and 26 injured when the truck they were on had a brake failure and rolled backwards off of a steep embankment. The dead scouts ranged in age from 13 to 16 years old, and were riding in the back of the truck on their way to the Hole in the Rock rock formation.
- Instructors from McDonnell's training department conducted two weeks of courses on Gemini spacecraft systems for flight controllers at MSC.
- President Kennedy signed the Equal Pay Act of 1963 into law in the United States.
- Died: Anita King, 78, American silent film actress who, in 1916, became the first woman to drive an automobile across the United States.

== June 11, 1963 (Tuesday) ==
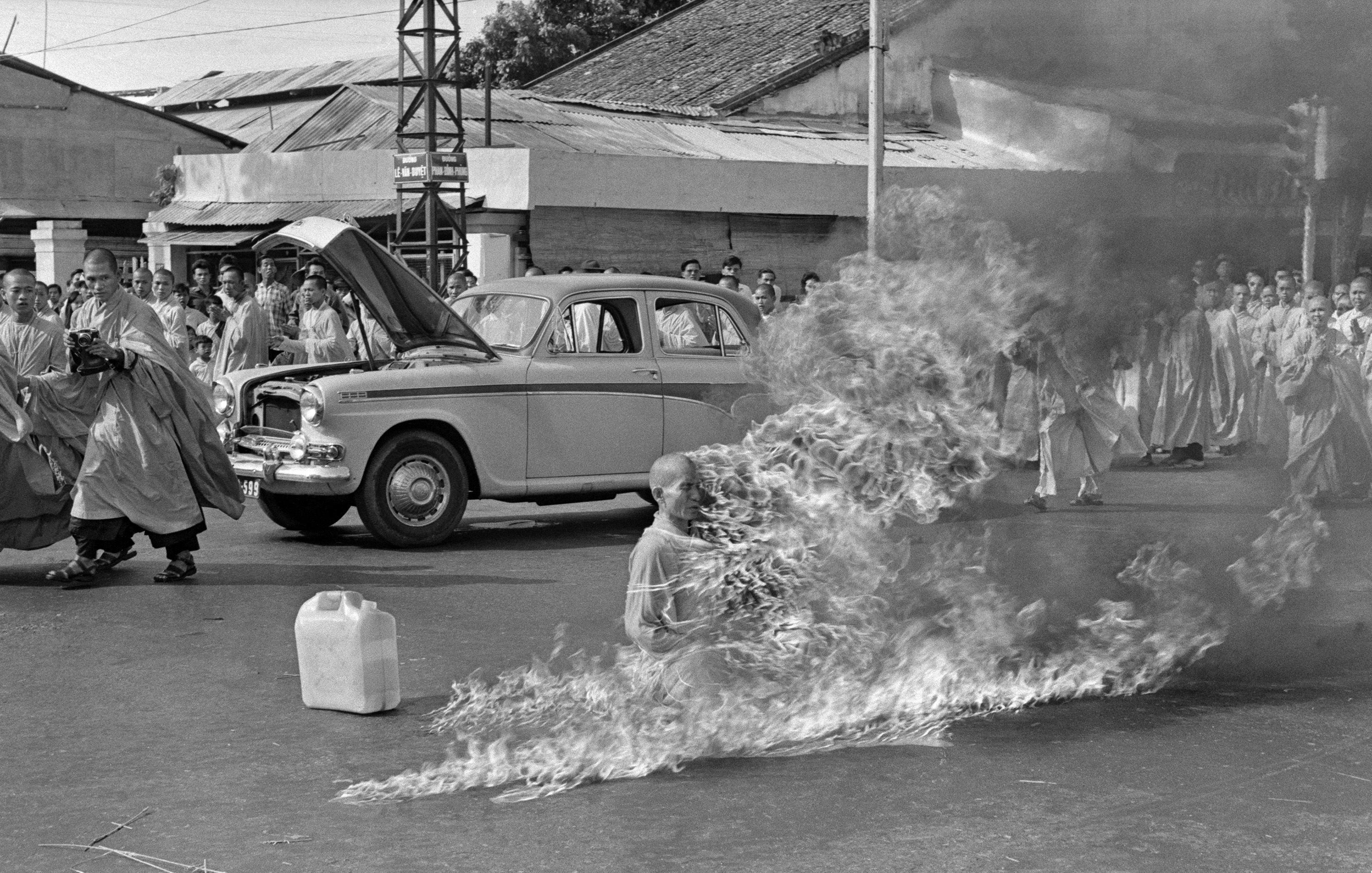
June 11, 1963: Self-immolation of Thích Quảng Đức

- South Vietnamese Buddhist monk Thích Quảng Đức, 65, committed suicide by self-immolation, burning himself to death at a major intersection in Saigon to protest the oppression of Buddhists by the government of President Ngo Dinh Diem. Associated Press photographer Malcolm Browne was the only journalist "to heed Buddhist advance notices", and his photographs brought worldwide attention the next day, as well as winning him a Pulitzer Prize. "Many point to the self-immolation," one historian would later note, "as the single event that turned the U.S. government against Ngo Dinh Diem, though a series of events and personality clashes made the situation inevitable."

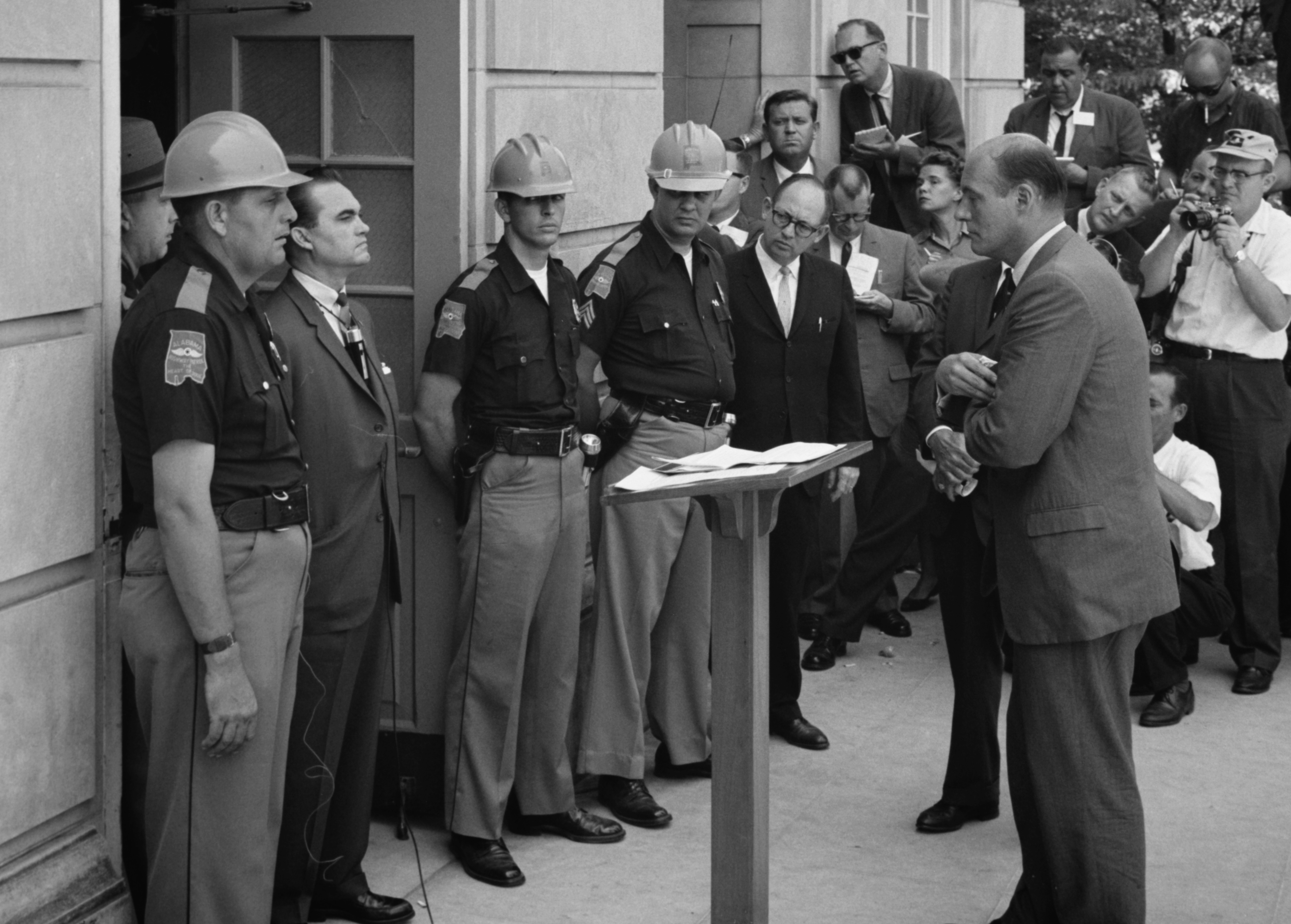
June 11, 1963: Alabama Governor Wallace confronts Deputy U.S. Attorney General Katzenbach

- Alabama Governor George C. Wallace stood in the door of the University of Alabama to protest against integration and blocked James Hood and Vivian Malone from enrolling as the first African American students at the university. U.S. Defense Secretary Robert McNamara ordered that the Alabama National Guard be placed under the command of the federal government and directed the 31st Infantry Division of the Guard to proceed to Tuscaloosa. Assistant U.S. Attorney General Nicholas Katzenbach approached Wallace and cited the U.S. District Court order of June 5, requiring that the students be allowed to register, and Wallace replied, "We don't need a speech here," and then read aloud a statement that he did "hereby proclaim and demand and forbid this illegal and unwarranted action by the central government." Governor Wallace stepped aside at 3:40 that afternoon, after the Alabama National Guard commander, Brigadier General Henry V. Graham, told Wallace that the Guard would enforce the President's order, and Wallace, who elected not to be arrested for contempt of federal court, stepped aside. Fifteen years later, Ms. Jones revealed that she and Mr. Hood had actually been admitted to the University of Alabama the previous day, a detail confirmed by university records and by interviews with Jones, Hood and university president Frank A. Rose.
- The first lung transplant on a human being was performed at the University of Mississippi, by Dr. James Hardy. The patient, identified twelve days later as John Richard Russell, a convicted murderer serving a life sentence for a 1957 killing, was given a full pardon by Mississippi Governor Ross Barnett, in recognition of Russell's volunteering for the operation, which Barnett said would "alleviate human misery and suffering in years to come". The donor, never identified, had arrived at the hospital emergency room in the evening after having a massive heart attack, and the family permitted the donation of the left lung for transplant; Russell survived for 18 more days after the surgery.
- U.S. President Kennedy delivered his historic speech Report to the American People on Civil Rights in which he promised a civil rights bill and asked for "the kind of equality of treatment that we would want for ourselves."
- Died:
  - Syed Abdul Rahim, 53, Indian footballer and first manager of the Indian national team, died of cancer.
  - Alfred V. Kidder, 77, American archaeologist

== June 12, 1963 (Wednesday) ==
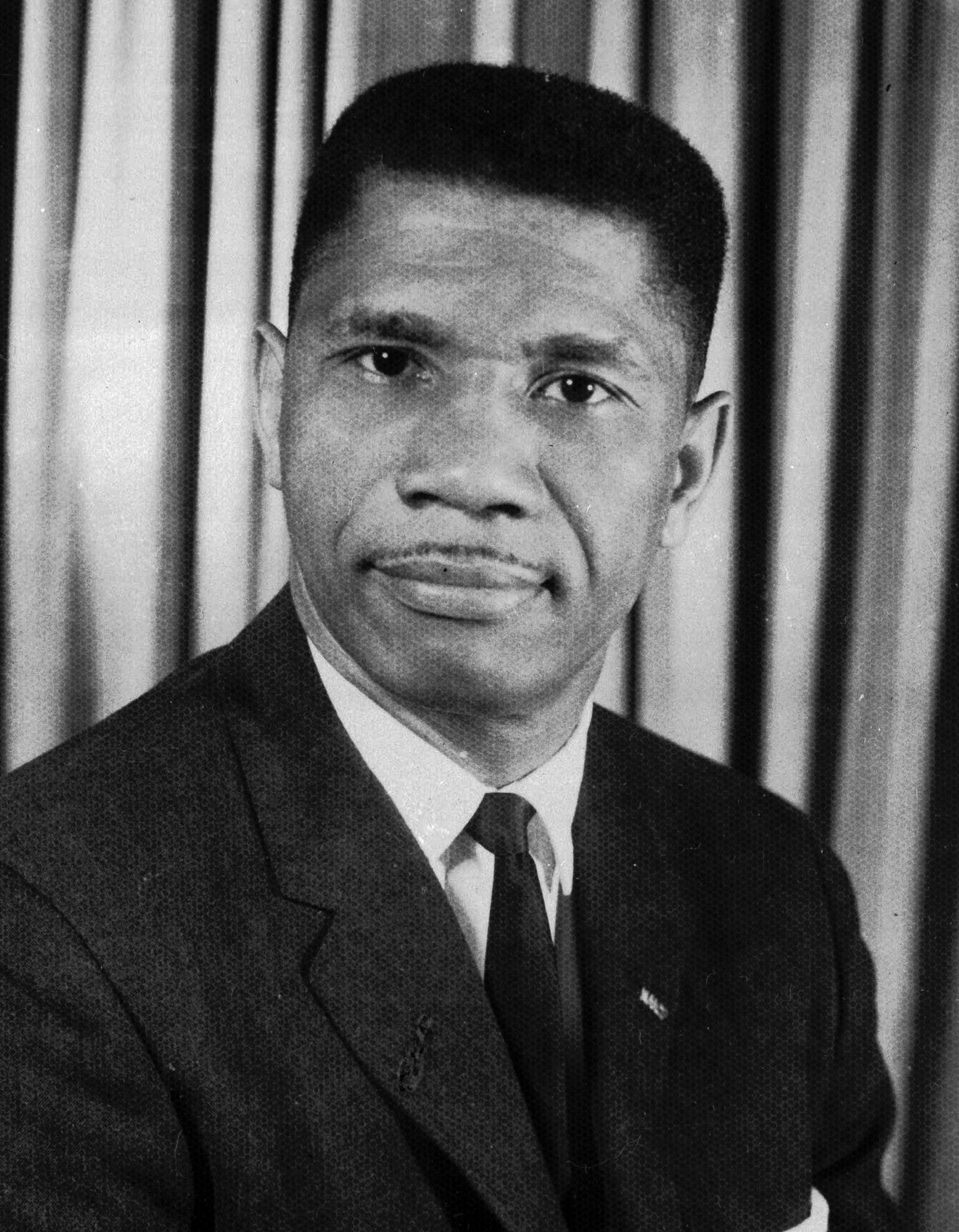
Evers

- Medgar Evers, a 37-year-old African-American civil rights activist, was shot and killed while standing in his driveway in Jackson, Mississippi. KKK member Byron De La Beckwith was arrested within two weeks. After two trials in 1964 that would both end without the jurors being able to reach a verdict, Beckwith would elude conviction for thirty years before being retried. He would be convicted of the murder on February 5, 1994, and spend the rest of his life in prison, dying in 2001. The Evers home, at 2332 Margaret Walker Alexander Drive, is now designated as a historic landmark.
- The long-awaited film Cleopatra, starring Elizabeth Taylor and Richard Burton, had its worldwide premiere, making its debut at the Rivoli Theatre in New York City. With a running time of 248 minutes, the epic historical drama lasted more than four hours.
- NASA Administrator James E. Webb told a Senate subcommittee that Project Mercury had come to an end after 4 years and 8 months, with Project Gemini's two-astronaut missions to be next.
- Died: Andrew Browne Cunningham, 80, British Admiral who commanded the Royal Navy's Mediterranean Fleet, and then the Allied Expeditionary Force, during World War II. Nicknamed "ABC", he became the First Sea Lord in 1943.

== June 13, 1963 (Thursday) ==
- U.S. Representative Thomas F. Johnson of Maryland and former U.S. Representative Frank W. Boykin of Alabama were both convicted of conspiracy to defraud the United States government and accepting bribes. Boykin would later be pardoned, while Johnson, after appealing his conviction all the way to the United States Supreme Court, would serve six months in prison.
- NASA's full attention turned toward Project Gemini, using two astronauts for each mission in the next phase of U.S. spaceflight. Rocketdyne announced its initial designs of Gemini's thrust chamber assembly for both the reentry control system and orbit attitude and maneuver system for the first four Gemini spacecraft, while McDonnell Aircraft began deciding what Project Mercury equipment and personnel could be used for the new program. The David Clark Company was awarded a contract for the Gemini spacesuit, with a fixed fee of $829,594.80 plus costs.
- Born: Greg Daniels, American screenwriter, television producer, and director; in New York City

== June 14, 1963 (Friday) ==
- Valery Bykovsky was launched into orbit by the Soviet Union on board Vostok 5. Bykovsky would spend almost five days in space, breaking the record set by Andriyan Nikolayev during Vostok 3, and making 82 orbits before returning on June 19, at the same time as Vostok 6 and Valentina Tereshkova.
- Born: Duane "Keffe D" Davis, American gang member who was charged with involvement in the murder of Tupac Shakur in 1996; in Compton, California
- Died: Carl Skottsberg, 82, Swedish Antarctic explorer

== June 15, 1963 (Saturday) ==
- The French retailing chain Carrefour opened the first hypermarket in Europe. With 2,500 square metres (27,000 sq ft) of floor space for a grocery store and department store, parking space for 350 cars, and its own gasoline station, the first Carrefour hypermarket was opened at the Paris suburb of Sainte-Geneviève-des-Bois, Essonne.
- NASA's Gemini Project Office announced that Gemini 3, the first U.S. mission with two astronauts, would last for three orbits before its return to Earth, during which the crew would use a new technology, orbital thrusters, to change the course of the orbit. Gemini 3 would be launched on March 23, 1965, with Gus Grissom and John Young.
- Born: Helen Hunt, American film and TV actress, winner of the 1997 Academy Award for Best Actress for As Good as It Gets and four Primetime Emmy Award for Outstanding Lead Actress in a Comedy Series for Mad About You; in Culver City, California

== June 16, 1963 (Sunday) ==
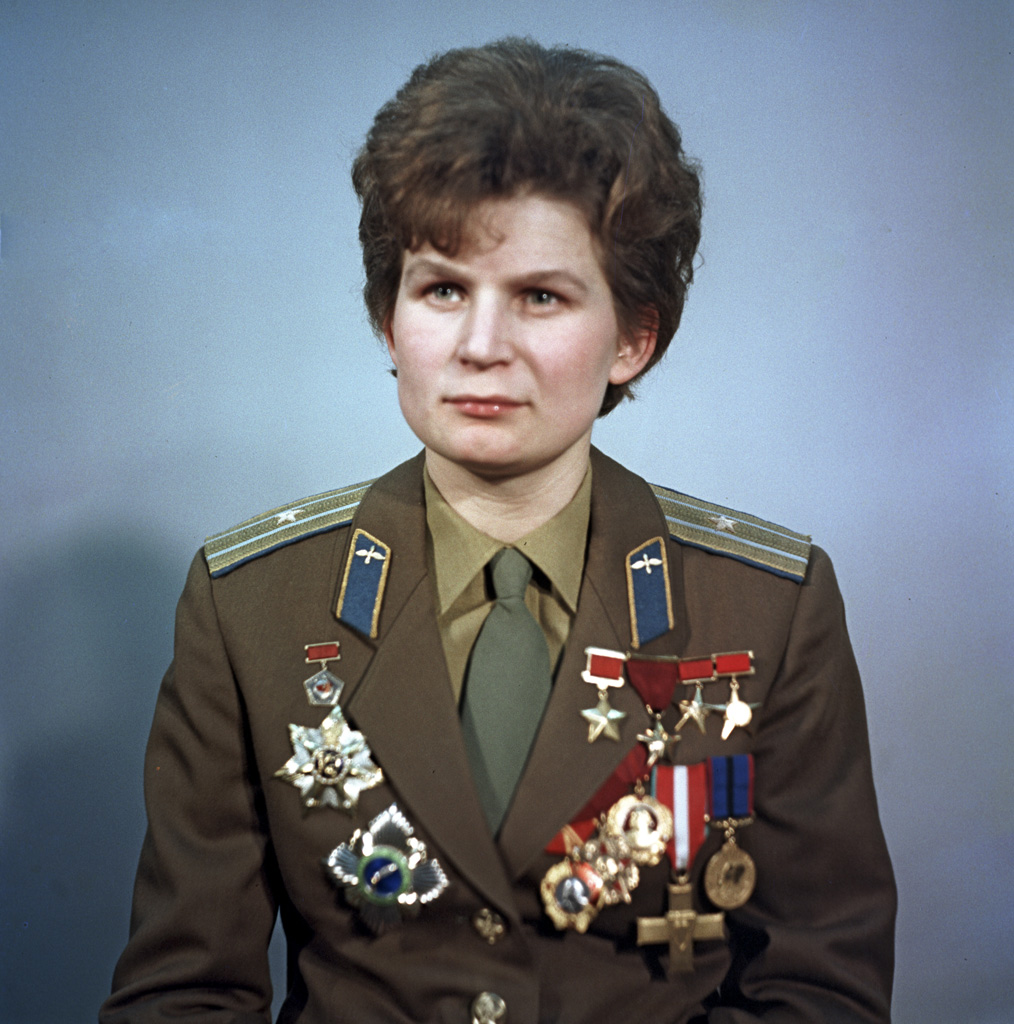
Tereshkova in 1969

- Soviet cosmonaut Valentina Tereshkova became the first woman in history to travel into outer space as Vostok 6 was launched. After Tereshkova, the 12th person ever to be sent into orbit, a woman would not travel into outer space again for 20 years until the launch of U.S. astronaut Sally Ride on June 18, 1983, as a mission specialist on the space shuttle Challenger. Tereshkova, who would retire from the Soviet Air Force as a colonel, would marry her fellow cosmonaut, Andriyan Nikolayev, and go into politics, becoming a deputy of the Supreme Soviet, and a member of the Soviet Communist Party's Central Committee.
- David Ben-Gurion, Prime Minister of Israel since it had become independent in 1948, resigned for what he described as "personal reasons". Ben-Gurion also quit his post as Israel's Defense Minister, which he had held since 1955. Levi Eshkol would succeed Ben-Gurion.
- In an attempt to resolve the Buddhist crisis in South Vietnam, President Ngo Dinh Diem and Buddhist leaders signed a Joint Communique.

== June 17, 1963 (Monday) ==
The 128 characters of the seven-bit ASCII code

- ASCII (United States of America Standard Code for Information Interchange) was approved by the American Standards Association, providing a universal seven-bit code of up to 128 character positions that could be used for communication between computer information processing systems.
- The U.S. Supreme Court ruled, 8–1, in the case of Abington School District v. Schempp that state-mandated Bible reading in public schools was unconstitutional. The case had been consolidated with Murray v. Curlett, brought by Madalyn Murray, who in 1965 would marry to become Madalyn Murray O'Hair, and would become the founder of American Atheists. The Schempp case was not the decision that banned prayer in American public schools, which had been rendered in Engel v. Vitale on June 25, 1962.
- Outside Xá Lợi Pagoda, in Saigon, shortly after 9:00 a.m, a crowd of around 2,000 people was confronted by police who still ringed the pagoda despite the signing of the Joint Communique. A riot broke out and police attacked the crowd with tear gas, fire hoses, clubs and gunfire. One protester was killed and scores more injured. Moderates from both sides urged calm while some government officials blamed "extremist elements". An Associated Press story described the riot as "the most violent anti-Government outburst in South Vietnam in years".
- AiResearch installed the Gemini environmental control system (ECS) developmental test unit in a boilerplate spacecraft for the Gemini program.
- Died:
  - Alan Brooke, 1st Viscount Alanbrooke, 79, British field marshal and Chief of the Imperial General Staff during World War II
  - John Cowper Powys, 90, British novelist

== June 18, 1963 (Tuesday) ==
- A new recovery beacon that could be detected from as far as 123 miles (198 km) away was successfully tested for NASA at Galveston Bay in Texas. The prototype for the new Gemini spacecraft was evaluated by airplanes flying at an altitude of 10,000-feet (3,000 m) and would first be used on January 19, 1965 in the recovery of the Gemini 2 capsule.
- Born:
  - Christian Vadim, French film actor; in Boulogne-Billancourt, to actress Catherine Deneuve and film director Roger Vadim
  - Bruce Smith, American NFL defensive end and member of Pro Football Hall of Fame; in Norfolk, Virginia
- Died: Pedro Armendariz, 51, Mexican actor, committed suicide.

== June 19, 1963 (Wednesday) ==
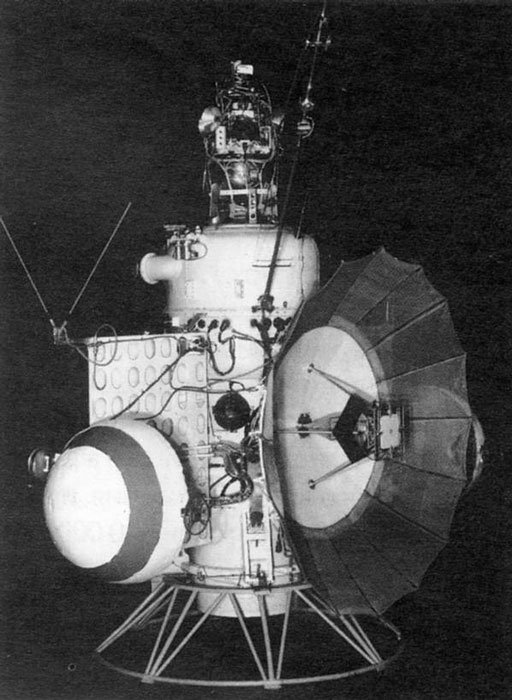
Mars 1

- The Soviet Union's Mars 1 spacecraft came within 120,000 miles (190,000 km) of the planet Mars as the first man-made object to reach the Red Planet, but was unable to return any data to Earth because of a malfunction that occurred in its antenna on March 21.
- President Kennedy secretly approved a CIA program of renewed sabotage of the infrastructure of Cuba, though abiding by his pledge never to invade the Communist island nation.
- What would become the Civil Rights Act of 1964 was sent by President Kennedy to the United States Congress and was introduced the next day in the House Judiciary Committee by U.S. Representative Emanuel Celler. The most comprehensive civil rights legislation in United States history, the legislation would be passed after Kennedy's assassination, with President Lyndon B. Johnson signing it into law on July 2, 1964.
- The papal conclave began its meeting in the Sistine Chapel at the Vatican, to elect a successor to Pope John XXIII. Voting would begin the next day.
- Valentina Tereshkova, the first woman in space, returned to Earth with cosmonaut Valery Bykovsky on Vostok 6.
- A NASA working group set standards for the testing of communication between the first two U.S. space vehicles that would be docked in orbit, the Gemini spacecraft and the Agena target vehicle. Testing was set for the Launch Area Radar Range Boresight Tower on Merritt Island.

== June 20, 1963 (Thursday) ==
- The Moscow–Washington hotline (officially, the Direct Communications Link or DCL) was authorized by the signing of a "Memorandum of Understanding Regarding the Establishment of a Direct Communications Line" in Geneva, Switzerland, by representatives of the Soviet Union and the United States. Though depicted in fiction as a red telephone, the hotline consisted of one teleprinter each in both nations, linked by two cable circuits routed between Washington, D.C., and Moscow by way of London, Copenhagen, Stockholm and Helsinki, and two backup radio circuits that used Tangier (in Morocco) as a midpoint. Initially, the American DCL teleprinter was located inside the Pentagon, and could transmit at 65 words per minute. The first announced use of the line would be in 1967 during the Six-Day War fought between Israel and its Arab neighbors.
- The 234th and final episode of the situation comedy Leave It to Beaver was broadcast on the ABC television network in the U.S., ending a six-season run that had started on October 4, 1957. The last episode was a "clip show", with the Cleaver family (played by actors Hugh Beaumont and Barbara Billingsley as the parents, and Tony Dow and Jerry Mathers as the two brothers) reminiscing in order to show scenes from the show's run.
- The U.S. Civil Aeronautics Board refused to allow a proposed merger of American Airlines and Eastern Airlines.
- The United States team won the first ever Federation Cup of tennis, defeating Australia in the finals.
- Swedish Air Force Colonel Stig Wennerström was arrested as a spy for the Soviet Union.
- The first dynamic dual-ejection test of the Gemini escape system was run at China Lake. On the same day, McDonnell Aircraft began obtaining comments and recommendations on the design of the Gemini spacecraft from experienced NASA personnel.
- The Eclipse-Pioneer Division of the Bendix Corporation briefed the Manned Spacecraft Center on its study of stabilization techniques for high-resolution telescopes aboard future orbiting space laboratories.
- The Great Escape (a war film starring Steve McQueen and Richard Attenborough) premiered in London.
- Phil Graham, publisher of The Washington Post, entered Chestnut Lodge, a psychiatric hospital in Rockville, Maryland, for the second time. Two weeks later, he would shoot himself.

== June 21, 1963 (Friday) ==
- Cardinal Giovanni Battista Montini, the Archbishop of Milan, was elected as the 262nd pope, succeeding the late Pope John XXIII. Cardinal Montini took the regnal name Pope Paul VI, the first pontiff with that name since Paul V (who reigned from 1605 to 1621), and would lead the Roman Catholic Church until his death in 1978. Theologian Hans Küng would later write in his memoirs that "Montini got 57 votes, only two more than the two-thirds majority required," on the sixth ballot, with Cardinals Giacomo Lercaro of Bologna, Leo Joseph Suenens of Belgium and Augustin Bea of Germany having been under consideration as well.
- Leonid Brezhnev, the ceremonial President of the Presidium of the Soviet Union, was appointed to a position in the Secretariat of the Soviet Communist Party, and viewed as "the dominant contender for succession to Premier Khrushchev as party chief and possibly as head of the government". The predictions proved to be correct, as Brezhnev would be named the Communist Party First Secretary upon the removal of Nikita Khrushchev on October 14, 1964.

== June 22, 1963 (Saturday) ==
- The French magazine Salut les copains organised a concert on the Place de la Nation in Paris, featuring singers such as Johnny Hallyday, Richard Anthony, Eddy Mitchell and Frank Alamo. The concert attracted an audience of over 150,000.
- Born: Randy Couture, three-time UFC Heavyweight Champion; in Everett, Washington
- Died: Maria Tănase, 49, Romanian folk singer, died of cancer

== June 23, 1963 (Sunday) ==
- Israel's ruling MAPAI party selected Finance Minister Levi Eshkol to be the new party leader and Prime Minister of Israel.
- New York Mets centerfielder Jimmy Piersall hit the 100th home run of his major league career, and his first with the Mets, and celebrated by running backwards around the bases. The Mets beat the Phillies 5–0. Piersall was dropped by the Mets soon after and finished out his 1,734 game career with the Los Angeles Angels in 1967.
- Byron De La Beckwith was arrested by the FBI on suspicion of the murder of Medgar Evers, and delivered to the police in Jackson, Mississippi, to be charged with violating the civil rights of Evers, rather than with his murder.
- The 1963 Tour de France began with 130 cyclists, representing 13 teams.
- Jim Clark won the 1963 Dutch Grand Prix at Zandvoort.
- The "Enchanted Tiki Room" opened in Disneyland at the Disneyland Resort. The attraction is considered to be the first to feature Audio-Animatronics technology, a WED Enterprises patented invention. Similar attractions would open in Magic Kingdom (in 1971, as "Tropical Serenade") and in Tokyo Disneyland (in 1983, closing in 1999).
- Born: Colin Montgomerie, Scottish professional golfer with six consecutive European Tour championships; in Glasgow

== June 24, 1963 (Monday) ==
- The Telcan, the first system designed to be used at home for recording programs from a television set, was given its first demonstration. The system, shown in England in Nottingham, was seen to record programs onto a reel of videotape and then to play them back with "very fair video quality" on a 17-inch (430 mm) TV. The tape could hold 30 minutes of programming, and the machine had a suggested retail price of £60 ($175).
- Landslides killed all 94 people in a village near Changsungpo on South Korea's Geoje Island. Another 22 people were killed in other landslides.
- The African sultanate of Zanzibar was granted self-rule by the United Kingdom, with full independence to be given on December 10.
- Two U.S. aerospace firms, Boeing and Douglas Aircraft Company, were selected for final negotiations for study contracts of a Manned Orbital Research Laboratory (MORL) concept. NASA's MORL concept envisioned a four-person Workshop with periodic crew change and resupply, and at least one crewmember spending a year in orbit to evaluate the effect of weightlessness on long-duration space flights.
- North American Aviation began a series of five drop tests of the boilerplate test vehicle, to qualify the parachute recovery system for the full-scale test vehicle in the Paraglider Landing System Program. A series of malfunctions in the fifth and final drop test, on July 30, would result in the destruction on impact of the test vehicle and a complete failure of the recovery system. Tesing of the Gemini retrorocket abort system by the Arnold Engineering Development Center showed failures in the nozzle assembly and the cone and would lead to a redesign.
- Born:
  - Ángel Azteca, Mexican professional wrestler ("luchador"); in Gómez Palacio, Durango (died of a heart attack, 2007)
  - Sükhbaataryn Batbold, 24th Prime Minister of Mongolia from 2009 to 2012; in Choibalsan
- Died: Prince Ferdinando, Duke of Genoa, 79, third Duke of Genoa and member of the House of Savoy

== June 25, 1963 (Tuesday) ==
- Veselin Đuranović replaced Đorđije Pajković as President of the Executive Council of Montenegro. Montenegro was, at that time, one of the six constituent republics that made up the Socialist Federal Republic of Yugoslavia.
- Born:
  - George Michael (stage name for Georgios Kyriacos Panayiotou), top-selling British pop music singer for Wham! and later a successful solo career; in East Finchley, Middlesex(d. 2016)
  - Kent Austin, NFL and CFL quarterback, college football and Canadian football coach; in Natick, Massachusetts
  - Yann Martel, Spanish-born Canadian writer; in Salamanca

== June 26, 1963 (Wednesday) ==
- U.S. President Kennedy delivered his famous "Ich bin ein Berliner" speech in front of the Berlin Wall in West Berlin. After climbing a specially built reviewing stand at the Brandenburg Gate so that he could look into East Berlin, Kennedy was driven to the West Berlin city hall, where he addressed a crowd of 150,000 people. Kennedy began his speech by saying that "2,000 years ago, the proudest boast was civis Romanus sum [Latin, "I am a Roman"]. Today, in the world of freedom, the proudest boast is Ich bin ein Berliner [German, "I am a Berliner"]".
- Paul McCartney and John Lennon wrote their hit song "She Loves You", while staying at the Turk's Hotel in Newcastle-upon-Tyne. Paul would later recall that when he played the recording for his father, the elder McCartney suggested (unsuccessfully) that "yeah, yeah, yeah" should be replaced with "Yes! Yes! Yes!".
- The Soviet Union's penal system was reformed to provide for "colony-settlements" (kolonii-poselenya) for prisoners who "displayed evidence of their aptitude for reintegration into society".
- The Canadian circus ship Fleurus caught fire and sank at Yarmouth, Nova Scotia. All people and animals were saved except for some zebras.
- Born: Mikhail Khodorkovsky, Russian oil company owner and the wealthiest man in post-Soviet Russia, imprisoned 2003 to 2013 after opposing the government of Russian President Vladimir Putin, exiled since 2013; in Moscow

== June 27, 1963 (Thursday) ==
- The state of Minnesota enacted the first law in the United States requiring modifications of buildings to provide accessibility for handicapped persons, with Governor Karl Rolvaag signing the bill.
- Henry Cabot Lodge Jr., who had been the losing Republican candidate for Vice President of the United States in 1960, was nominated by the winner of that election, President Kennedy, to be the new U.S. ambassador to South Vietnam.
- In a visit to Ireland, U.S. President Kennedy visited Dunganstown in County Wexford, from which his great-grandfather Patrick Kennedy had left in 1843 to emigrate to the United States. "If he hadn't left," Kennedy joked, "I'd be working at the Albatross Company", a local fertilizer factory. Kennedy was hosted by his third cousin, widow Mary Ann Ryan.
- Gemini Project Office outlined plans for the first Gemini mission, to be launched in 1964. The test Gemini spacecraft would be a complete production shell, including shingles and heatshield, and equipped with a computer, inertial measuring unit, and environmental control system in the reentry module. The launching azimuth would be changed from 90 degrees to 72.5 degrees, the same azimuth used for Project Mercury, to obtain better tracking network coverage.

== June 28, 1963 (Friday) ==
- Two days after U.S. President Kennedy had delivered his "Ich bin ein Berliner" speech on the western side of the Berlin Wall, Soviet Premier Khrushchev gave a speech to workers at an East Berlin toolmaking factory and gave his response. According to reports, the English translation of the German translation of Khrushchev's Russian-language speech read, "I am told the President of the United States looked at the Wall with great indignation. Apparently, he didn't like it the least little bit. But I like it very much indeed. The working class of the German Democratic Republic has put up a wall and plugged the hole so that no more wolves can break in. Is that bad? It's good."
- McDonnell Aircraft presented a "scrub" recycle schedule to NASA, allowing for a new launch of a Gemini mission within 48 hours after the first launch was scrubbed. The Gemini Project Office wanted recycle time reduced to 24 hours, and ultimately to less than 19 hours to meet successive launch windows.
- Carlos Hugo, Duke of Parma, pretender to the thrones of Parma and Spain, was officially renamed Charles Hugues, by judgment of the court of appeal of la Seine, France.
- Born: Babatunde Fashola, Nigerian politician, 13th Governor of Lagos State from 2007 to 2015; in Lagos
- Died:
  - Tom Dumay, 21, American SCUBA diver, a Montana State University senior and a member of the Flathead County Lifesaving and Rescue Association, drowned in Lake McDonald while searching for the body of 6-year-old Gregory Trenor, who had drowned the previous day in Glacier National Park, United States. Dumay's diving partner, 21-year-old Ron Koppang, also of Columbia Falls, Montana, survived the dive but was treated for decompression sickness. Dumay's body was recovered the same day; Trenor's body was discovered on August 21.
  - John "Home Run" Baker, 77, American baseball player and National Baseball Hall of Fame inductee, American League home run leader for four seasons 1911 to 1914.

== June 29, 1963 (Saturday) ==
- The New York Journal American newspaper published a story headlined "High U.S. Aide Implicated in V-girl Scandal". Included in the article, by investigative reporters James D. Horan and Dom Frasca, was mention that call-girl Suzy Chang was a "former paramour" of "one of the biggest names in American politics— a man who holds a very high elective office". U.S. Attorney General Robert F. Kennedy, aware of the sexual encounters between his brother President John F. Kennedy and Chang, summoned Horan and Frasca to Washington for an interrogation and verified that the reporters "were indeed referring to his brother", then pressured them to halt further investigation.
- The University of East Africa was established by the University of London, with campuses in Kenya, Tanzania and Uganda. In 1970, the university was split into three independent institutions, the University of Nairobi, Makerere University, and the University of Dar es Salaam.
- The Saab 105 aircraft made its first flight.
- Died:
  - Ahmed Hilmi Pasha, 84, Palestinian leader and one time Prime Minister of the All-Palestine Government in 1948.
  - Frank Paul, 79, American science fiction illustrator

== June 30, 1963 (Sunday) ==
- Pope Paul VI was crowned at Vatican's St. Peter's Square in the last papal coronation to date.
- A car bomb killed five police officers and two military engineers in Italy at Ciaculli, a suburb of Palermo on the island of Sicily. A bomb that had been visible on the backseat of an Alfa Romeo car had been defused, but when a police officer opened the trunk of the automobile, a second bomb exploded. The event was the culmination of the First Mafia War, breaking the unofficial peace pact between the police and the Mafia; over the next month, 10,000 police were sent from the Italian mainland and 250 mafiosi were arrested, suspending the activities of the Cosa Nostra.
- The Alfred-Brehm-Haus, at the time the largest enclosed zoo building in the world (5,300 m^{2} or 1.3 acres) was opened at Tierpark Berlin with enclosures for the larger felines (including lions, tigers, leopards, jaguars and pumas), and a large aviary.
- Jim Clark won the 1963 French Grand Prix at Reims-Gueux.

== See also ==
- The Five Cities of June (The Five Cities of June), a documentary about the events of June 1963.
