= July 1963 =

Month of 1963

<<	July 1963					>>
Su	Mo	Tu	We	Th	Fr	Sa
	1	2	3	4	5	6
7	8	9	10	11	12	13
14	15	16	17	18	19	20
21	22	23	24	25	26	27
28	29	30	31

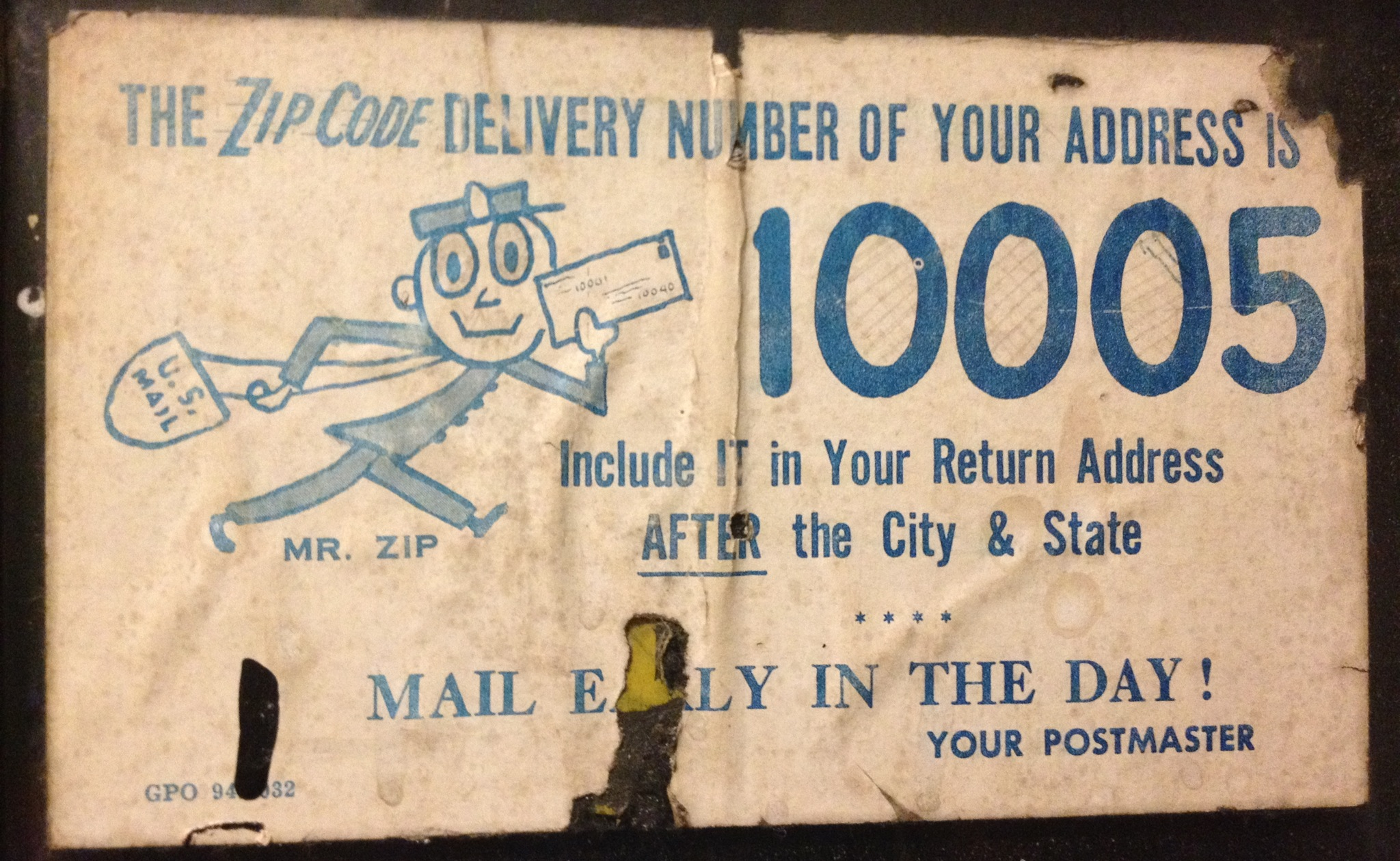
July 1, 1963: The ZIP Code is introduced in the U.S.

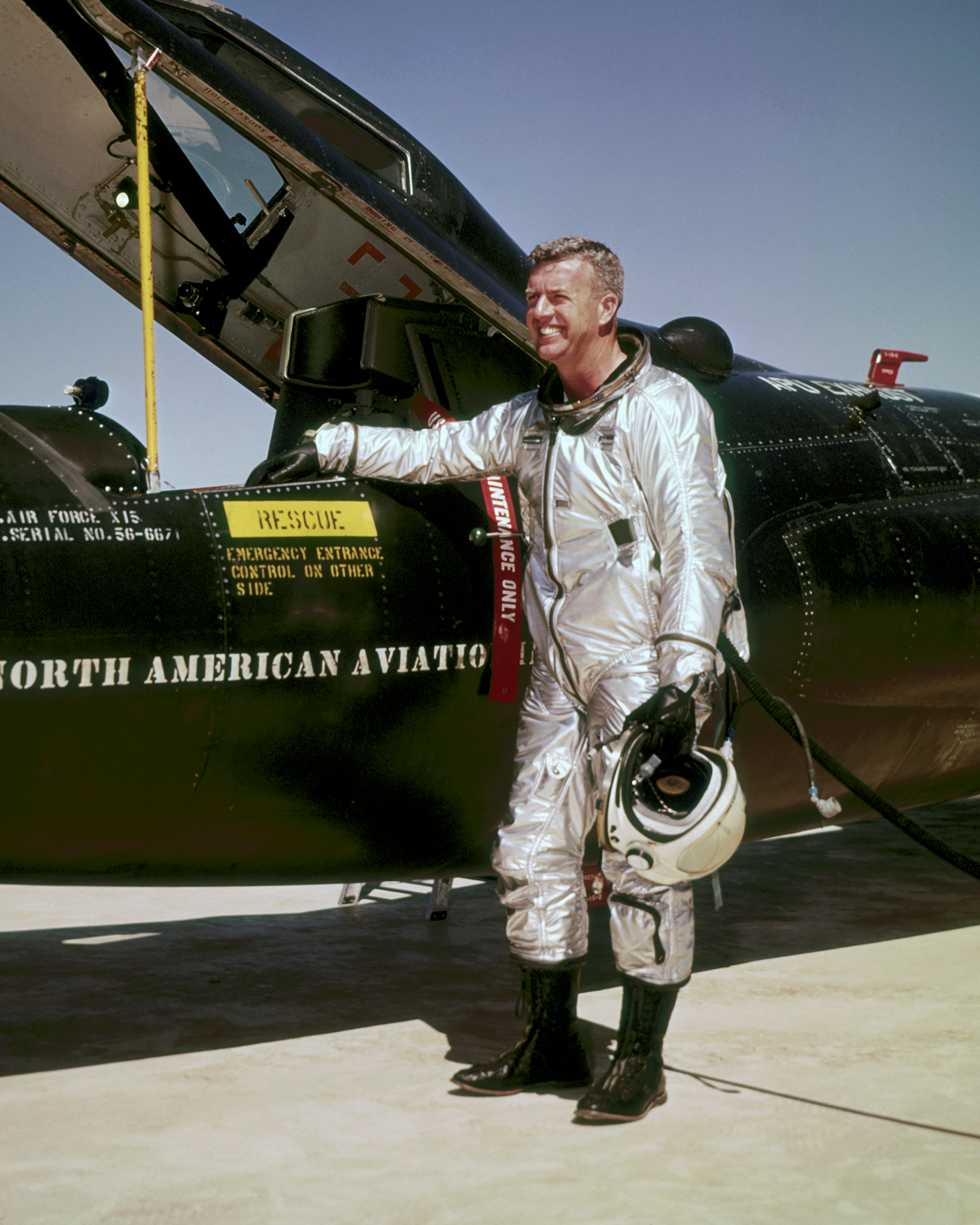
July 19, 1963: Joe Walker flies X-15 jet into outer space on first airplane flight above 100 km altitude

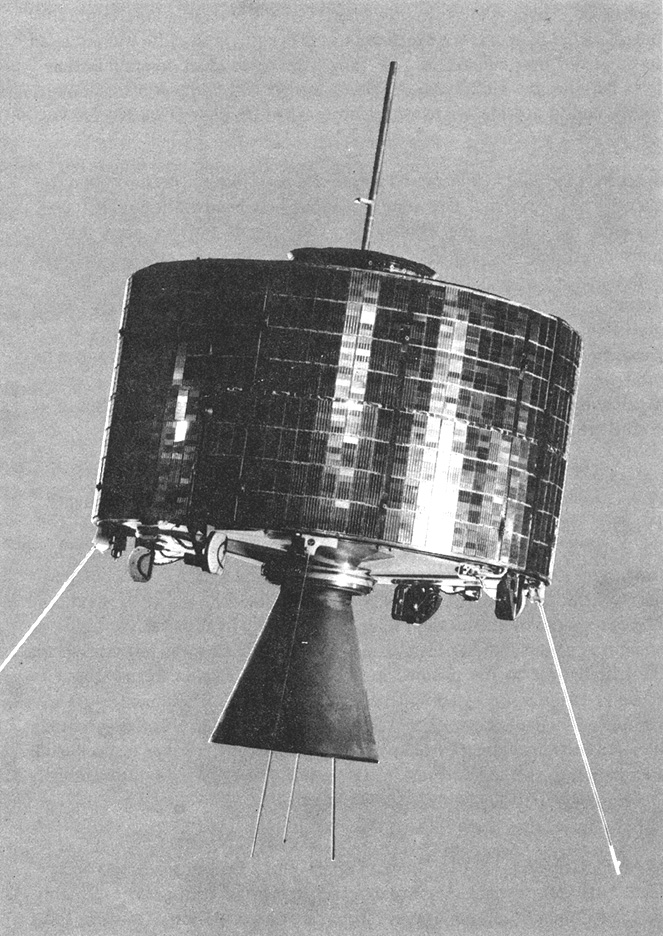
July 26, 1963: Syncom 2 becomes first geosynchronous satellite

The following events occurred in July 1963:

== July 1, 1963 (Monday) ==
- ZIP Codes were introduced in the United States, as the U.S. Department of the Post Office kicked off a massive advertising campaign that included the cartoon character "Mr. ZIP", and the mailing that day of more than 72,000,000 postcards to every mailing address in the United States, in order to inform the addressees of their new five digit postal code. Postal zones had been used since 1943 in large cities, but the ZIP code was nationwide. Use became mandatory in 1967 for bulk mailers.
- The crash of a Varig DC-3 airliner in Brazil's Rio Grande do Sul state killed 15 of the 18 people on board. The flight was approaching the airport at Passo Fundo on the second-leg of a scheduled trip from Porto Alegre when it impacted trees.
- Kim Philby was named by the Government of the United Kingdom as the 'Third Man' in the Burgess and Maclean Soviet spy ring.
- Died: Abdullah bin Khalifa, 53, Sultan of Zanzibar since 1960, died two days after undergoing emergency surgery. He was succeeded by his son, Jamshid bin Abdullah, the last to hold the title.

== July 2, 1963 (Tuesday) ==
- In a speech while visiting East Berlin, Soviet Premier Nikita Khrushchev endorsed the idea for the first time of a treaty to ban atmospheric testing of nuclear weapons. Khrushchev criticized the idea of sending inspectors to verify compliance, but said that "Since the Western powers obstruct the conclusion of an agreement banning all nuclear tests, the Soviet Government expresses its willingness to conclude an agreement banning nuclear tests in the atmosphere, in outer space and under water."
- Mohawk Airlines Flight 121, a Martin 4-0-4, crashed on takeoff at Rochester, New York, in the United States, killing 7 of the 43 people on board and injuring all 36 survivors. The plane was flying to White Plains, New York and, according to a witness "just as the craft began roaring down the runway for a take-off torrents of rain and hail pummeled it."
- Baseball pitchers Juan Marichal of the San Francisco Giants, and Warren Spahn of the Milwaukee Braves faced off against each other in a National League baseball game that one author would later call "the greatest game ever pitched". Tied 0–0 after nine innings, the game was won in the 16th by the Giants on a home run by Willie Mays.
- The 13th Berlin International Film Festival concluded. The Golden Bear was jointly awarded to Il diavolo by Gian Luigi Polidoro and Bushidô zankoku monogatari by Tadashi Imai.
- Brian Sternberg, the world record holder for the pole vault, broke his neck after falling from a trampoline, and was left a quadriplegic.
- Liberace and Barbra Streisand opened a run of shows at the Riviera in Las Vegas, Nevada.
- Died: Alicia Patterson, 56, American editor and publisher who founded the newspaper Newsday in 1940 for New York's Long Island; of complications following surgery for an ulcer

== July 3, 1963 (Wednesday) ==
- All 23 passengers and crew on New Zealand National Airways Corporation Flight 441 were killed when the Douglas DC-3, flew into a vertical rock face in New Zealand's Kaimai Ranges near Mount Ngatamahinerua.
- The 100th anniversary of the Battle of Gettysburg, turning point of the American Civil War, was celebrated with a re-enactment of Pickett's Charge.
- Died: Povl Baumann, 74, Danish architect

== July 4, 1963 (Thursday) ==
- The Constitution of Austria was amended to ease the 1919 act that had declared that "In the interest of the security of the Republic the former holders of the Crown and other members of the House of Habsburg-Lothringen are banished from the country", providing an exception for descendants of the former monarchs if they elected to "expressly renounce their membership of this House".
- Born:
  - David Joyner, American "in-suit performer" known for physically portraying Barney the Dinosaur (voiced by Bob West) on the PBS children's TV series Barney & Friends from 1991 to 2001 and as the title character in Hip Hop Harry; in Decatur, Illinois
  - Ute Lemper, German singer and actress, 1998 Olivier Award winner; in Münster, West Germany
  - Jan Mølby, Danish footballer with 33 caps for the Denmark national team; in Kolding
  - Christopher G. Kennedy, U.S. businessman and eighth child to Robert F. Kennedy and Ethel Skakel Kennedy; in Boston
- Died: Bernard Freyberg, 74, Governor-General of New Zealand from 1946 to 1952

== July 5, 1963 (Friday) ==
- A delegation from the People's Republic of China, led by Prime Minister Zhou Enlai, departed from Beijing on a train bound for Moscow, to attend talks in an effort to repair the poor relations between the Chinese Communists and Communist Party of the Soviet Union. The talks, intended to mend the Sino-Soviet split, would break down on July 14 when the Soviets published a rebuttal to Chinese charges that the Soviets had departed from the Communist ideology.
- The U.S. Senate set a new record for briefest session by meeting at 9:00 a.m., and then adjourning three seconds later. There were only two Senators present for the meeting. The previous record for brevity had been a five-second meeting on September 4, 1951.
- The sale of liquor, by the drink, was legal in the U.S. state of Iowa for the first time in more than 40 years, with "a restaurant in the lakes resort area in northwest Iowa" becoming the site of the first legal drink.
- Italian Prime Minister Giovanni Leone won on a vote of confidence in the Italian Senate, 133–110.
- McDonnell Aircraft Corporation began the first phase of Spacecraft Systems Tests (SST) on the instrumentation pallets to be installed in Gemini spacecraft No. 1. Gemini's inertial guidance system computer was integrated with the rest of the control systems, and all spacecraft wiring was found to be compatible with the computer, and operating with complete accuracy.

== July 6, 1963 (Saturday) ==
- The Roman Catholic Church relaxed itse ban on cremation as a funeral practice, when Pope Paul VI issued the Instruction that "the burning of the body, after all, has no effect on the soul, nor does it inhibit Almighty God from re-establishing the body", although the decision would not be revealed until May 2, 1964.
- Elections were held in Jordan for the 80 seats in the Chamber of Deputies of the National Assembly. All of the candidates were independent, in that political parties were banned at the time, and the results, as with most of the elections in Jordan to that time, were "poorly documented" and not officially published.
- Blood Feast first premiered at the Bellevue Drive-In in Bellevue (now Peoria), Illinois. Composed, shot, and directed by Herschell Gordon Lewis, the film is considered to be the first Splatter film, a sub-genre of horror noted for its graphic depictions of on-screen gore.
- The Vanoise National Park, located in the department of Savoie in the French Alps, was designated France's first National Park.
- A partial lunar eclipse took place.
- Died: George, Duke of Mecklenburg, 63, head of the House of Mecklenburg-Strelitz since 1934. He was succeeded by his son Georg Alexander.

== July 7, 1963 (Sunday) ==
- In the first round of Argentina's presidential election, Dr. Arturo Illia won a 25 percent plurality of the popular votes (2,441,064) and 169 of the 476 Electoral College votes, seventy short of a majority. Another physician, Dr. Oscar Alende, finished with 16.4%, and former General Pedro Aramburu was third. On July 31, electors for several of the other parties would vote for Illia, giving him 270 electoral votes. Dr. Illia's Radical Civic Union (UCR) Party (UCR) won only 72 of the 192 seats in the Chamber of Deputies, and Illia did not try to forge a coalition with the other parties.
- Seven people, including four children, were killed, and 17 injured, when a pilotless FJ-4 Fury jet fighter crashed into gatherers at a family reunion at the Green Hills Day Camp in Willow Grove, Pennsylvania. The pilot had ejected after the plane malfunctioned while he was attempting to land at the nearby Willow Grove Naval Air Station, and the jet crashed into a baseball field, killing one man, then skidded into a bathhouse where 50 people had been swimming or standing around the pool.
- In a fight between South Vietnamese government police and U.S. reporters, secret police loyal to Ngô Đình Nhu, brother of President Ngô Đình Diệm, attacked American journalists including Peter Arnett and David Halberstam at a demonstration during the Buddhist crisis.
- Died: Frank P. Lahm, 85, U.S. aviation pioneer who became, in 1909, the first military aviator after being selected by the U.S. Army to receive instruction on the Wright Flyer by Wilbur Wright.

== July 8, 1963 (Monday) ==
- The British comic strip Fred Basset was introduced, starting with its first appearance in the Daily Mail. Created by Scottish cartoonist Alex Graham, the strip, about the adventures of a Basset Hound, is syndicated worldwide.
- The British cargo ship Patrician sank off of Gibraltar after colliding with the U.S. ship Santa Emilia. Thirty-four of the 37 crew were rescued by Santa Emilia, but three men died.
- McDonnell warned NASA that the capacity of the Gemini Guidance Computer was in danger of being exceeded. The original function of the computer had been limited to providing rendezvous and reentry guidance, but other functions had been added, requiring an immediate review of computer requirements. In the meantime, it advised International Business Machines to delete one of the added functions, orbital navigation, from computers for spacecraft Nos. 2 and 3.
- Members of the 1963 American Everest Expedition team were awarded the Hubbard Medal by U.S. President John F. Kennedy for their achievement.

== July 9, 1963 (Tuesday) ==
- The "20-point agreement" to create the Federation of Malaysia, effective September 16, was signed in London by the UK Prime Minister Harold Macmillan and representatives of four of the five intended members of Malaysia: the Federation of Malaya, the Crown Colony of North Borneo (which became the state of Sabah), State of Sarawak and the state of Singapore. The fifth member, the British protectorate over the Sultanate of Brunei, declined to join the Federation. The state of Singapore would be expelled from the Federation of Malaysia on August 9, 1965 and would become an independent republic.
- Gemini astronaut candidates began testing of the "human centrifuge" equipped to simulate the command pilot's position in the spacecraft. The testing was for evaluation of pilot controls and displays required for launch and reentry of a Gemini mission, along with the seat and pressure suit operation under acceleration, and the restraint system. Training was completed on July 12. The participants were generally satisfied but recommended minor changes.
- The G2C Gemini pressure suit made by David Clark Company proved unsatisfactory because the torso could be stretched out of shape and a visor guard had made the helmet too large to wear during use of the escape hatch.

== July 10, 1963 (Wednesday) ==
- The all-white University of South Carolina was ordered to admit its first African-American student, Henri Monteith, by order of U.S. District Judge J. Robert Martin. On the same day, Judge Martin ordered the desegregation of all 26 of South Carolina's state parks.
- The brief partnership of "Rodgers and Lerner" was dissolved, and production of the first Rodgers-Lerner musical, I Picked a Daisy, was halted permanently. Composer Richard Rodgers had successfully collaborated with lyricist Lorenz Hart (Babes in Arms), and then with lyricist Oscar Hammerstein II (The Sound of Music), while lyricist Alan Jay Lerner had a successful team with composer Frederick Loewe (My Fair Lady). The two were unable to work together successfully beyond "half a dozen" songs for Daisy.
- Coordination between NASA and the U.S. Department of Defense (DOD) in crewed space station studies was reported by a panel to be inadequate, especially at the technical level.
- Project Emily, the deployment of American-built PGM-17 Thor Intermediate-range ballistic missiles in the United Kingdom, was disbanded.
- A Vostok-2 rocket launched by the USSR failed shortly after take-off.

== July 11, 1963 (Thursday) ==
- A military coup ousted Carlos Julio Arosemena Monroy, President of Ecuador, who was succeeded by naval commander Ramón Castro Jijón. After surrendering the presidential palace, Arosemena was placed on an Ecuadorian Air Force plane and flown to Panama. The "final straw" for the coup leaders had been a state dinner the night before, "when the obviously inebriated president made disparaging remarks about the United States" while talking to the American ambassador.
- The sinking of the Argentine ferry Ciudad de Asunción killed 53 of the 420 people on board, after the boat caught fire and went down in the River Plate between Buenos Aires in Argentina and Montevideo in Uruguay.
- In South Africa, 19 ANC and MK leaders, including Arthur Goldreich and Walter Sisulu, were arrested at Liliesleaf Farm, Rivonia, the headquarters of Umkhonto we Sizwe.
- The Manned Spacecraft Center (MSC) informed the Defense Department of unresolved range safety problems concerning a catastrophic failure of the Titan II Gemini rocket because of a tank rupture. MSC recommended use of a hypergolic propellant rather than cryogenic fuel.
- Born:
  - Al MacInnis, Canadian NHL and Olympic champion ice hockey defenceman who played in 1,416 games from 1982 to 2003; in Inverness, Nova Scotia
  - Lisa Rinna, American actress, television personality and model; in Newport Beach, California
  - Manuel Marrero Cruz, Cuban politician currently serving as the 18th Prime Minister of Cuba; in Holguín

== July 12, 1963 (Friday) ==
- The first "Gambit" military reconnaissance satellite was launched from Vandenberg Air Force Base in California at 1:44 p.m., and the film recovered proved it to be a major advancement in observation. The new system had "exceptional pointing accuracy" in aiming its cameras, and the pictures obtained had a resolution of 3.5 feet (1.1 m).
- The Congress of the Philippines approved a land reform program that had been proposed by President Diosdado Macapagal. Among other things, the law outlawed sharecropping and provided for a means of large estates to be gradually turned over to the people who farmed them.
- The Pulau Senang prison riot took place at the experimental offshore penal colony in Singapore. Superintendent Daniel Dutton and several prison officers were murdered by inmates and the prison was burned to the ground.
- Pauline Reade, 16, was abducted and murdered by Myra Hindley and Ian Brady in Manchester, England, in the first of the "Moors murders". Reade's remains would not be discovered until July 1, 1987.
- NASA approved backing up the first Gemini flight payload with a boilerplate reentry module and a production adapter, at an additional cost of $1,500,000.
- Died: Slatan Dudow, 60, Bulgarian film director and screenwriter

== July 13, 1963 (Saturday) ==
- In the Soviet Union, 33 of the 35 persons on Aeroflot Flight 012 were killed when the plane crashed as it was approaching a landing at the Irkutsk Airport in Siberia. The Tupolev Tu-104 had departed Beijing in China, bound for Moscow, with one scheduled stop in Irkutsk.
- The Legislative Assembly of the Cook Islands voted unanimously to reject an offer by New Zealand to be granted independence, and chose instead to become a self-governing Associated State with its residents to remain New Zealand citizens.
- Bob Charles defeated Phil Rodgers in a 36-hole playoff to win the British Open. Charles became the first left-handed golfer to win one of golf's major championships.
- The Roman Catholic Diocese of Santiago de Veraguas was erected.
- Died: Blessed Carlos Manuel Rodríguez Santiago, 44, first layperson in the history of the United States to be beatified

== July 14, 1963 (Sunday) ==
- U.S. Undersecretary of State W. Averell Harriman arrived in Moscow in order to negotiate the nuclear test ban treaty, and brought with him three tons of American telephone and telex equipment to set up the Moscow–Washington hotline agreed upon by the Americans and Soviets on June 20.
- France's Jacques Anquetil won the 50th Tour de France.
- Died:
  - Rear Admiral Gilbert Jonathan Rowcliff, 81, U.S. Navy officer and former Judge Advocate General of the Navy
  - Sivananda Saraswati, 75, Hindu spiritual leader

== July 15, 1963 (Monday) ==
- The Kingdom of Tonga issued the first round postage stamps in history. The stamps (which were also the first to be made of gold foil rather than paper) were designed to commemorate the first gold coins in Polynesia.
- Born: Brigitte Nielsen, Danish model and actress, known for Rocky IV and Beverly Hills Cop II; in Rødovre

== July 16, 1963 (Tuesday) ==
- At Seattle, five men began a 30-day engineering test of life support systems for a crewed space station in The Boeing Company space chamber. Designed and built for NASA's Office of Advanced Research and Technology, the chamber was first in the U.S. to include all life-support equipment for a multi-person, long-duration space mission (including environmental control, waste disposal, and crew hygiene and food techniques). In addition to the life support equipment, a number of crew tests simulated specific problems of spaceflight. Five days into the 30-day test, however, the simulated mission was halted because of a faulty reactor tank.
- The Peerage Act 1963 was approved by the House of Lords, 105 to 25. The change of rules, which received royal assent on July 31, cleared the way for hereditary peers within the House of Lords to disclaim their peerages in order to be allowed to run for and take a seat in the elected House of Commons. Tony Benn, who lost his seat in Commons in 1960 when he inherited the title of Viscount Stansgate and automatically became a member of the House of Lords, disqualified himself under the new law and successfully ran for office under in a by-election.
- Born:
  - Srečko Katanec, Slovenian soccer football midfielder with 31 games for the Yugoslav national team, later manager who coached the national teams of five different countries (Slovenia, Macedonia, the United Arab Emirates, Iraq and Uzbekistan); in Ljubljana, SR Slovenia, Yugoslavia
  - Paul Hipp, American actor and musician; in Philadelphia
  - Phoebe Cates, American actress; in New York City

== July 17, 1963 (Wednesday) ==
- For the first time in history, a U.S. federal court ordered a change in the size of the legislature of a U.S. state, decreasing the number of seats in the Oklahoma House of Representatives from 120 to 100. The court also ordered a reapportionment of both the House and the state Senate on a strict population basis. The decision was the first to rely on the U.S. Supreme Court case of Baker v. Carr, decided on March 26, 1962, holding that federal courts could review state legislative apportionment.
- Born:
  - King Letsie III, ruler of the Southern African nation of Lesotho since 1990 and son of Moshoeshoe II, Paramount Chief of Basutoland; as David Mohato Bereng Seeiso in Morija, Basutoland colony
  - Katherine Clark, U.S. Representative for Massachusetts since 2013 and the House Minority Whip since 2023; in New Haven, Connecticut

== July 18, 1963 (Thursday) ==
- Colonel Jassem Alwan of the Syrian army, backed by financing from President Gamal Abdel Nasser of Egypt, led an attempt to overthrow the government of Syria in order to establish a pro-Nasser government that would reunite with the United Arab Republic. The coup attempt came only 30 minutes after President Lu'ay al-Atassi had departed from Damascus on an invitation from President Nasser for a meeting in Egypt. After Alwan seized the Damascus radio station and the Syrian Army headquarters, Interior Minister Amin al-Hafiz, "sub-machinegun in hand", directed the Ba'ath Party National Guard on a counterattack and regained control. Hundreds of people were killed in the battle; Alwan was able to escape, but 27 officers who had participated in the coup were executed by firing squad, marking an end of "the time-honoured tradition whereby losers were banished to embassies abroad". President Atassi would resign on July 27 in protest over the brutal treatment of the coup leaders.
- Olympiacos F.C. won the final of the Greek Cup football competition, 3 to 0 over Pierikos.
- Born: Marc Girardelli, Austrian Olympic alpine ski racer; in Lustenau

== July 19, 1963 (Friday) ==
- An artificial heart pump was placed inside a human being for the first time, at the Methodist Hospital in Houston, Texas University of Houston by a team led by Dr. Michael E. DeBakey. The unidentified patient survived for four days before dying of complications from pneumonia.
- A 25-pound (11 kg) bomb was inadvertently dropped on downtown San Francisco by a U.S. Navy Reserve pilot on a routine exercise flight. The unarmed bomb fell at the intersection of Market Street and Front Street, bounced over the eight-story tall IBM building and damaged another building three blocks away, but nobody was injured.
- American test pilot Joseph A. Walker, flying the X-15, reached an altitude of 65.8 miles (105.9 km), achieving a sub-orbital spaceflight by recognized international standards (which define outer space as beginning 100 kilometres (62 mi) above the Earth).
- Died: Guy Scholefield, 86, New Zealand archivist who compiled the Dictionary of New Zealand Biography

== July 20, 1963 (Saturday) ==
- The first Yaoundé Convention was signed in the capital of Cameroon by 18 African nations that had gained independence relatively recently. It would take effect on June 1, 1964, and be operative for five years. Parties to the agreement were Burundi, Cameroon, the Central African Republic, Chad, the Republic of the Congo (Brazzaville), the Republic of the Congo (Leopoldville), Dahomey, Gabon, the Ivory Coast, the Malagasy Republic, Mali, Mauritania, Niger, Rwanda, Senegal, Somalia, Togo, and Upper Volta. After the expiration on May 31, 1969, a new convention would be signed at Yaoundé on July 29 of that year.
- The sinking of the British ore carrier freighter Tritonica killed 33 of its 42-member crew after it collided with another British ship, the Roonagh Head, and went down within four minutes in the St Lawrence River in Canada near Petite-Rivière-Saint-François, Quebec. Most of the Tritonica crew had been sleeping when the ships collided at 3:00 in the morning and were unable to escape in time.
- An attempt to reconcile the differences between the Soviet Communist Party and the Chinese Communist Party ended in failure, after more than a week of conferences in Moscow.

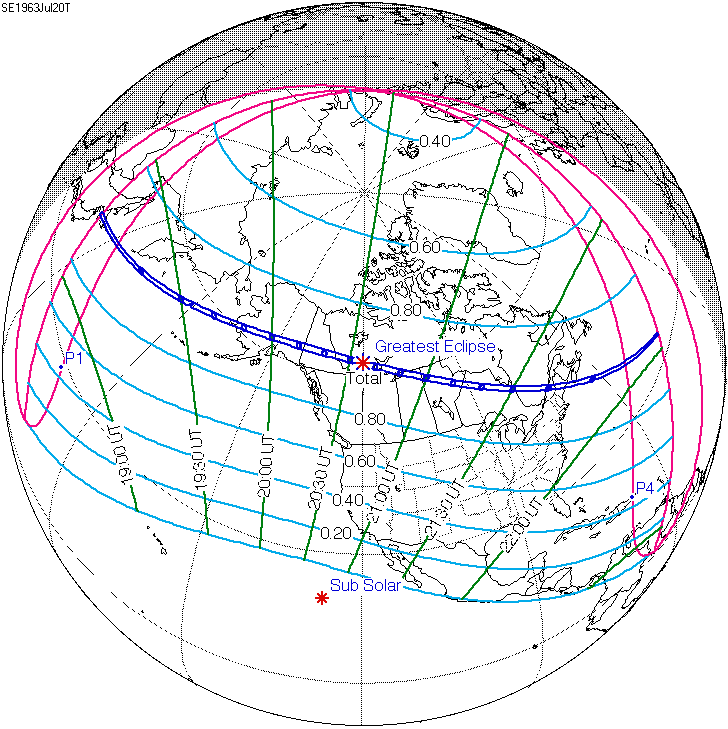
Solar eclipse of July 20, 1963

- For the first time since June 30, 1954, a total solar eclipse was visible from North America and was "the most scientifically observed eclipse in history" up to that time. A chartered DC-8 jet airplane flew a group of astronomers along the path of the eclipse so that the totality could be observed for 44 seconds longer than for people on the ground. The point of greatest eclipse was in Canada's Northwest Territory, near its border with Alberta.
- Su Mac Lad won the International Trot harness racing event on Long Island, bringing his career winnings to $687,549, the most of any pacer or trotter as of that date.
- Mary Mills won the 1963 U.S. Women's Open in golf.

== July 21, 1963 (Sunday) ==
- Jack Nicklaus, 23, described in The New York Times as "a young man who has achieved more in 13 months than most golfers do in a life-time", won the Professional Golf Association championship. In the 72-hole tournament, held in Dallas and one of the professional golf major competitions, Nicklaus had a score of 279, two strokes ahead of runner-up Dave Ragan, who finished at 281. Nicklaus had won the 1962 U.S. Open on June 17, 1962, in only his 17th game on the PGA Tour, and the 1963 Masters Tournament on April 7.
- NASA announced that Dr. George Mueller would succeed D. Brainerd Holmes as the head of the Apollo program.
- Died: Ray Platte, 37, American stock car driver, died of a skull fracture sustained the previous day during a 100-lap NASCAR race at the South Boston Speedway in Virginia.

== July 22, 1963 (Monday) ==
- World heavyweight boxing champion Sonny Liston retained his title in a rematch fight against former champion Floyd Patterson, whom he had defeated ten months earlier, on September 20, 1962. In the first bout, he knocked out Patterson in the first round in two minutes, six seconds. In the rematch at Las Vegas, Liston took four seconds longer.
- Please Please Me became the first record album by The Beatles to be released in the United States. Vee Jay Records deleted two of the songs that had appeared on the British version introduced on March 22, including the title song.
- Sarawak was granted conditional independence from the British Empire pending the establishment of the Federation of Malaysia.

== July 23, 1963 (Tuesday) ==
- The Supreme Court of East Germany sentenced Hans Globke, Chief of Staff for West Germany's Chancellor Konrad Adenauer, in absentia to life imprisonment "for continued war crimes committed with complicity and crimes against humanity in partial combination with murder". Globke retired from his post on October 15 after his 65th birthday and remained in the West until his death in Bonn in 1973.
- A modified prototype Super Frelon helicopter broke the FAI absolute helicopter world speed record, attaining a maximum speed of 217.7 mph (350.4 km/h) during the flight.
- Died: Vasile Luca, 65, former Romanian Vice-Premier who had been imprisoned since 1952 following his purge from the Romanian Communist Party Politburo.

== July 24, 1963 (Wednesday) ==
- U.S. President John F. Kennedy hosted a group of American high school students who were part of the Boys Nation event sponsored by the American Legion, including 16-year-old Bill Clinton, who would become the 42nd U.S. President in 1993. Clinton would later use a film clip of him shaking hands with Kennedy as part of his 1992 campaign.
- Victor Marijnen became the new Prime Minister of the Netherlands, replacing Jan de Quay.
- Born: Karl Malone, American NBA basketball forward, nicknamed "The Mailman" for his reliable delivery of scores, NBA Most Valuable Player 1997 and 1999; in Summerfield, Louisiana
- Died: U.S. Navy Lieutenant Commander Hal Russell Crandall, 34, one of 12 finalists for the selection of NASA Astronaut Group 1 (the first U.S. astronauts, known as the "Mercury Seven"), was killed in the crash of his F-8 Crusader into Subic Bay in the Philippines. In 1959, Crandall had been one of the 32 finalists for the Mercury program, and remained after the group had been reduced to 27 and then 12 before seven were selected by NASA.

== July 25, 1963 (Thursday) ==
- Representatives of the United States, the United Kingdom and the Soviet Union initialed the Partial Nuclear Test Ban Treaty, the first agreement ever for the banning of nuclear weapons tests in the atmosphere, outer space and underwater. Soviet Foreign Minister Andrei Gromyko, U.S. Undersecretary of State W. Averell Harriman, and the British Minister of Science, Lord Hailsham, gave their tentative approval at the Spiridonovka Palace in Moscow, in advance of the formal signing.
- South Korea introduced the Order of Diplomatic Service Merit for meritorious service to the extension of national prestige overseas and to the promotion of friendship with other nations.
- Died: Ugo Cerletti, 85, Italian neurologist and pioneer of electroconvulsive therapy in psychiatry

== July 26, 1963 (Friday) ==
- NASA launched Syncom 2, the world's first geostationary (synchronous) satellite. Synchronization would be achieved eight days later, on August 3, with Syncom 2 reaching a point 22,500 miles (36,200 km) above Brazil, and then moving at 6,880 miles per hour (11,070 km/h) in order to keep pace with the Earth's equatorial rotational movement of 1,040 miles per hour (1,670 km/h).
- An earthquake killed 1,800 people in Skopje in Yugoslavia (now in North Macedonia). The earthquake struck at 5:17 a.m. local time.

== July 27, 1963 (Saturday) ==
- Syria's Lu'ay al-Atassi, whom rebels loyal to the United Arab Republic had attempted to overthrow on July 18, resigned as both the Chairman of the Syrian Revolutionary Council, equivalent to the president of the Middle Eastern republic and as Commander in Chief of the Syrian Army, and was replaced in both jobs by the Deputy Premier, Major General Amin al-Hafiz, who was also Minister of Defense and Minister of the Interior. Although no explanation was given at the time for Atassi's sudden departure, a later account said that he quit because of Hafiz's order of execution of 27 of the rebels by firing squad.
- Tom and Jerry returned to movie theaters in their first cartoon short since 1962, Pent-House Mouse. Chuck Jones, best known for his work on Looney Tunes, would direct 33 more shorts, ending with Purr-Chance to Dream in 1967.
- The computer science study of analysis of algorithms was initiated by the publication of "Notes on Open Addressing", by Donald Knuth.

Morgan

- Died: Garrett Morgan, 86, African-American inventor known for inventing the smoke hood (in 1912) and a hair-straightening product, and the automatic "semaphore arms" traffic light.

== July 28, 1963 (Sunday) ==
- All 63 people on United Arab Airlines Flight 869 were killed when the de Havilland Comet 4C, crashed into the Arabian Sea at 1:50 in the morning while preparing to land in India at Bombay-Santa Cruz Airport, in heavy rain and turbulence. The dead included 26 Boy Scouts from the Philippines, who had been on their way to the 11th World Scout Jamboree in Greece. On July 19, 1962, another UAA Flight 869, also a de Havilland Comet 4C, had crashed on its approach to Bangkok, killing all 26 people on board.
- Fernando Belaúnde Terry was inaugurated as President of Peru. The former architect succeeded General Francisco Morales Bermúdez, who transferred power to the civilian government after elections were held. Belaúnde would be overthrown in a military coup on October 3, 1968, but would be elected President again in 1980, serving until 1985.
- Three days after the Nuclear Test Ban Treaty was initialed in Moscow, the Soviet Defense Minister, Marshal Rodion Malinovsky, published an announcement in Red Star and in Pravda, indicating the military's opposition to Premier Khrushchev's treaty with the "imperialist camp".
- George F. Kennan resigned as United States Ambassador to Yugoslavia because of the worsening state of relations between the two countries.
- Died: Carl F. W. Borgward, 72, German engineer and automobile manufacturer

== July 29, 1963 (Monday) ==
- The Los Angeles Herald-Examiner published its copyrighted story, "Black Muslim Founder Exposed as a White", declaring that W. D. Fard, who had started the black nationalist organization in 1930, had actually been a white man named Wallace Dodd. The Herald-Examiner story included photographs supplied by the FBI, but Fard's successors at the Nation of Islam denied the story as a hoax.
- West Indies defeated England in the 4th Test (cricket) by 221 runs, at Headingley, Leeds.
- The Tu-124A prototype, SSSR-45075, made its first flight.

== July 30, 1963 (Tuesday) ==
- The Soviet newspaper Izvestia, and Radio Moscow, reported that Kim Philby, a double agent who had been spying for the Soviets while employed by Britain's MI5 spy agency, had been given asylum in Moscow. Philby had disappeared on January 23.
- Maxime A. Faget, Engineering and Development Director for MSC's Space Vehicle Design Branch, enlisted North American Aviation to study modifications to the basic Apollo spacecraft that would extend its capabilities to function in orbit for missions of up to 100 days— more than three months— without resupply. Faget's objective was a space laboratory for a three-person crew, with an orbital altitude of between 160 kilometres (99 mi) and 480 kilometres (300 mi), and light enough to be launched on a Saturn IB rocket. Two separate vehicles were under consideration, an Apollo command module and a command module and separate mission module to be used as living quarters. Despite the possibility of a 100-day flight, the longest of the Apollo missions would be the final one, Apollo 17, which would last for a little more than 12 days.
- Born: Lisa Kudrow, American TV actress and Emmy Award winner best known for portraying Phoebe Buffay on Friends; in Encino, California
- Died: Patrick J. Hurley, 80, U.S. Secretary of War from 1929 to 1933

== July 31, 1963 (Wednesday) ==
- The Peerage Act 1963 received royal assent in the United Kingdom, opening membership in the House of Lords to women, and to more than the 16 members of the peerage of Scotland. In addition, the Act allowed an hereditary peer to disclaim his automatic membership among the Lords, which would clear the way for Alec Douglas-Home to become a member of the House of Commons, then Prime Minister.
- Paul Foytack of the California Angels became the first Major League Baseball pitcher to surrender four consecutive home runs, during the sixth inning of a 9–5 loss to the Cleveland Indians. Only one other player accomplished the feat, when Chase Wright of the New York Yankees gave up four homers in a row in a 7–6 loss to the Boston Red Sox on April 22, 2007.
- United Nations Security Council Resolution 180 was adopted, calling upon Portugal to recognize the right of the peoples of its colonial empire to self-determination and independence. The United Kingdom, the United States and France, three of the five permanent members of the Council, abstained.
- Dr. Arturo Illia was formally elected as President of Argentina by that nation's electoral college, receiving 261 of the 576 votes. Minutes later, former President Arturo Frondizi was released by the military government that had deposed him on March 29, 1962. Dr. Illia would be inaugurated on October 12.
- The Tupamaros (officially, the Movimiento de Liberacion Nacional or MLN), a terrorist organization seeking to overthrow the government of Uruguay and to rid the South American nation of American and Brazilian businesses, carried out their first attack, striking at a gun club in Montevideo.
- Electronic-Electrical Interference (EEI) Tests of Gemini launch vehicle (GLV) 1 began in the vertical test facility at Martin-Baltimore, to uncover any interference between GLV electrical and electronic systems.
- The Manila Accord of the Diosdado Macapagal initiative was signed by the Federation of Malaya, the Republic of Indonesia and the Republic of the Philippines.
- Born: Fatboy Slim (born Quentin Cook), British musician, DJ and record producer; in Bromley, Kent
