= Mahoungou =

Mahoungou is a Congolese surname. Notable people with the surname include:

- Alice Mahoungou (born 1939), trade unionist and politician from the Republic of the Congo
- Anthony Mahoungou (born 1994), French football player
