= African Women's Union of the Congo =

The African Women's Union of Congo (French: Union des femmes africaines au Congo, abbreviated U.F.A.C.) was a women's organization in Congo-Brazzaville. U.F.A.C. was closely associated with the Congolese Youth Union (U.J.C.). U.F.A.C. largely failed to obtain a following beyond the milieus around U.J.C.

U.F.A.C. was affiliated to the International Women's Federation (F.I.F.).

== Leadership ==
Alice Mahoungou (née Alice Badiangaba) was a women's activist and politician in Brazzaville who became one of the leaders of the African Women's Union of the Congo (U.F.A.C.). In addition, she was an activist on behalf of the Congolese Youth Union (U.J.C.).
