= Congolese Youth Union =

Youth organization in the Republic of the Congo (1956-64)

Union de la jeunesse Congolaise
- Abbreviation: U.J.C.
- Formation: 1956
- Dissolved: 1964
- Purpose: Marxism
- Leader: Aimé Matsika
- Affiliations: World Federation of Democratic Youth

The Congolese Youth Union (French: Union de la Jeunesse Congolaise; abbreviated UJC) was a youth organization in Congo-Brazzaville. The U.J.C. was initially merely a local branch of the Republican Youth Union of France (U.J.R.F.), the youth wing of the French Communist Party. However it developed into an independent organization and began organizing cells in different parts of the territory. The movement established a sizeable presence in the cities of lower Congo, such as Point-Noire, Jacob and Dolisie. U.J.C. was led by the trade union leader Aimé Matsika.

The organization worked in close cooperation with the Confédération générale africaine du travail trade union movement and the African Women's Union of Congo. The U.J.C. statutes were deposited with the authorities in 1956.

U.J.C. was a member organization of the World Federation of Democratic Youth.

After independence U.J.C. was targeted by the government of Fulbert Youlou, which labelled the organization as 'communist'. In March 1960 the National Assembly began preparing a law which would restrict the activities of U.J.C. and C.G.A.T. On May 9, 1960 Matsika and other U.J.C. leaders were arrested. By the time the offensive against U.J.C. and C.G.A.T. began, Youlou had already been able to corner the parliamentary opposition. In mid-August 1963, U.J.C. and C.G.A.T. took part in an uprising against Youlou's rule, and together with the army they deposed the government. When a new military/civilian government was formed on Christmas Eve 1963, Matsika was included as Minister of Commerce and Industry.

In 1964 the National Movement of the Revolution (M.N.R.) was established as the sole legal political party, with its own youth wing being the J.M.N.R.
