= Trois Glorieuses (1963) =

1963 uprising in the Republic of the Congo

- Date: August 13–15, 1963
- Location: Congo-Brazzaville
- Result: Fulbert Youlou ousted out of power and goes into exile.

Parties
(Republic of the Congo) Congo-Brazzaville	Congolese trade unions: Congolese Youth Union; CGAT; Armed Forces of the Republic of the Congo

Lead figures
(Republic of the Congo) Fulbert Youlou	no centralized leadership

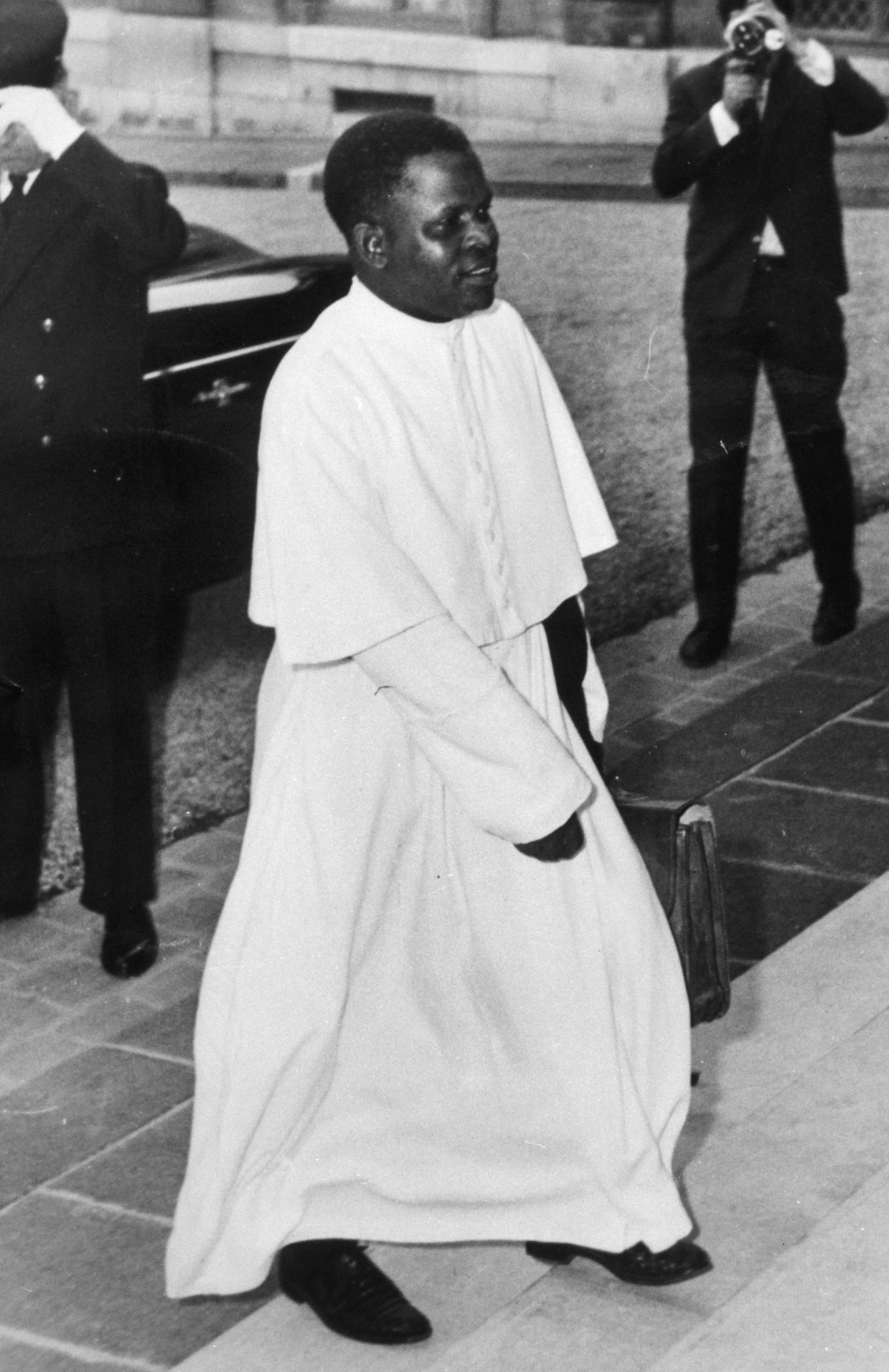
Fulbert Youlou 1963

The Trois Glorieuses (lit. 'Three Glorious Days') was an uprising in Congo-Brazzaville which occurred from August 13 to 15, 1963. The uprising ended the rule of the first Congolese President, Fulbert Youlou, as the opposition trade union movement and Congolese Youth Union struck an alliance with the army.

== Background ==
Congo-Brazzaville had become independent in 1960. The rule of the first president, Fulbert Youlou, developed in an increasingly authoritarian direction. During a tour of Haut-Congo in August 1962, Youlou proposed turning Congo into a one-party state, led by his party UDDIA. At the time, other political parties had ceased to function as an effective opposition, whilst the trade union movement CGAT and the Congolese Youth Union (two groups singled out by Youlou as 'communists') had suffered crackdowns. Youlou's party was dominated by his ethnic group, the Brazzaville based Lari, and as such they dominated much of Congolese society and industry at the time. Youlou's increasing favoritism massively sidelined and aggravated the northern peoples, not helped by his unhelpful comments that they might be better off joining the Central African Republic instead of staying with Congo. Unpopular, corrupt and now having alienated virtually all non-Lari in the country, the stage was set for tensions to reach a head.

By mid-1963, the Congolese labour movement had become increasingly vocal. A state visit by Guinean president Sékou Touré on June 5–6 proved a turning point. During Touré's visit, trade unions and youth movements held protests, hailing Touré and ridiculing Youlou. Later, a united front of trade union centres was formed. On July 2, 1963, two joint trade union committees were formed, one of them consisting of CGAT, CSAL and CATC. In protest against the proposal to install a one-party rule, the trade unions called for a general strike on August 13, 1963.

== August 13 ==
Protests began on August 12, consisting of organised workers and unemployed young people who had been drawn to the city by impoverished conditions elsewhere in the country who had become increasingly infuriated by Youlou's corruption, pro-French policies and ultra-conservatism. The rallyists called for raised salaries, and for the release of detained labour activists. Soldiers opened fire on the crowd, killing three trade unionists. The rallies turned into violent riots. Houses were sacked, and a follower of Youlou killed.

== Fall of Youlou ==
As of August 14, Youlou's government remained in place. Youlou's own forces were unwilling to assist him any further, in part due to the reluctance of the French officers to intervene. Consequently, Youlou sought French military intervention to support his government, but the French president, Charles de Gaulle, denied Youlou's request. On August 15, the Congolese military withdrew their support from Youlou and sided with the trade unions and the Congolese Youth Union. Youlou's government collapsed and he was placed under house arrest, before being spirited out of the country by friendly Gendarmerie. Youlou sought asylum in France but his application was rejected which led to him seeking refuge in Spain instead where he later died.

== New government ==
The uprising and the fall of Youlou brought two groups into power: the military and the trade unionists. However, neither group was represented in the provisional government formed on August 15, 1963 (with the Bakongo Alphonse Massemba-Débat chosen as Prime Minister). On August 16, the trade unionists formed a National Revolutionary Council (CNR).

Massemba-Débat came to power sustained by a wide coalition of forces, all claiming to be Marxist or nationalist, but whose sole common ground was opposition to Youlou. He struggled to impose control over the country with the creation of a single new party, the Mouvement National de la Révolution (MNR). Within a few weeks, riots and violence at Brazzaville, perpetrated by armed youths and some army officers whose targets were the Lari and Western businessmen, indicated the regime's authority was weak. To restore order and win the support of radical youth and labor leaders, Massemba-Débat forcibly merged them into single organizations called, respectively, the Jeunesse du Mouvement National de la Révolution (JMNR) and the Confédération Syndicale Congolaise (CSC). He made both the JMNR and CSC branches of the MNR, seeking to neuter their power. In so doing, however, he in reality allowed ardent socialists and extremists to effectively absorb and take over the Catholic labor unions, mission schools, and youth groups, and to form paramilitary groups that rapidly became competitive with the armed forces.

Massemba-Débat's government of largely apolitical technocrats in many ways marked a far sharper break with the past than did Youlou's with the colonial administration. Massemba-Débat deliberately set Congo on a new course of closer relations with the Socialist bloc, and imposed state control over organized labor and segments of trade, transport, and natural resources. He was careful, however, not to alienate the West, whose flow of technical and financial aid was vital to Congo; or to antagonize private investors by nationalizing existing business enterprises; or to permit the MNR's extremist paramilitary groups to estrange the armed forces.

== Legacy ==
The uprising was named after the July Revolution, and was also a reference to the Gaullist seizure of power in French Equatorial Africa between July 26 and 28, 1940. The date of the victory of the revolution, August 15, was also the Independence Day of Congo as well as the Christian holiday of Assumption, a coincidence to which mythical importance was attached.

In 1970, a new national anthem, Les Trois Glorieuses, named after the 1963 revolution, was adopted.
