= 1963 Jordanian general election =

General elections were held in Jordan on 6 July 1963. As political parties were banned at the time, all candidates ran as independents.
