= 1963 visit by Sékou Touré to the Republic of the Congo =

First Guinean President visit to Congo

Between June 5 and 6, 1963, the Guinean president Sékou Touré made an official visit to Brazzaville, the capital of the Republic of the Congo. He was received by the Congolese president Fulbert Youlou. The visit sparked protests against the Congolese government, marking a beginning to the popular movement that would end Youlou's rule two months later.

Touré's visit followed a visit by Youlou to Guinea in 1962. During the visit economic cooperation between the two countries was discussed, and Touré pledged that Guinean bauxite and iron would be made available for Congolese needs for industrialization.

At a speech at the Brazzaville City Hall, Touré denounced the reactionary policies and extravagant lifestyle of the Congolese leadership. He called on the peoples to overthrow the regimes of exploiters and imperialist lackeys. The speech was met with applause and praise from Congolese trade unionists, who hailed him with slogans such as 'Long live the president of Africa! Youths and trade unionists took to the streets. Slogans raised included 'Long live the independence of Africa!', 'Down with Fulbert Youlou!' and 'Down with those who plunder the Congo'. These protests marked the beginning of more politicized trade union militancy.

Discontent with Youlou's rule continued to simmer. Following Touré's visit, Youlou sought to reach a compromise with trade unions and youth movements through power-sharing in a provisional government. However, on August 13 a strike was declared, and Youlou's rule was finished during the wave of protests which came to be known as the Trois Glorieuses.
