= Confédération générale aéfienne du travail =

The Confédération générale aéfienne du travail (CGAT) was a trade union centre in French Equatorial Africa. CGAT was founded in April 1957 by the Confédération générale du travail du Kamerun (the erstwhile Cameroonian branch of the French Confédération générale du travail, which had broken away from CGT in December 1956) and CGT branches in French Equatorial Africa. CGAT was based in Brazzaville. CGAT was affiliated to the World Federation of Trade Unions.
