= March 1962 =

Month of 1962

<<	March 1962					>>
Su	Mo	Tu	We	Th	Fr	Sa
				1	2	3
4	5	6	7	8	9	10
11	12	13	14	15	16	17
18	19	20	21	22	23	24
25	26	27	28	29	30	31

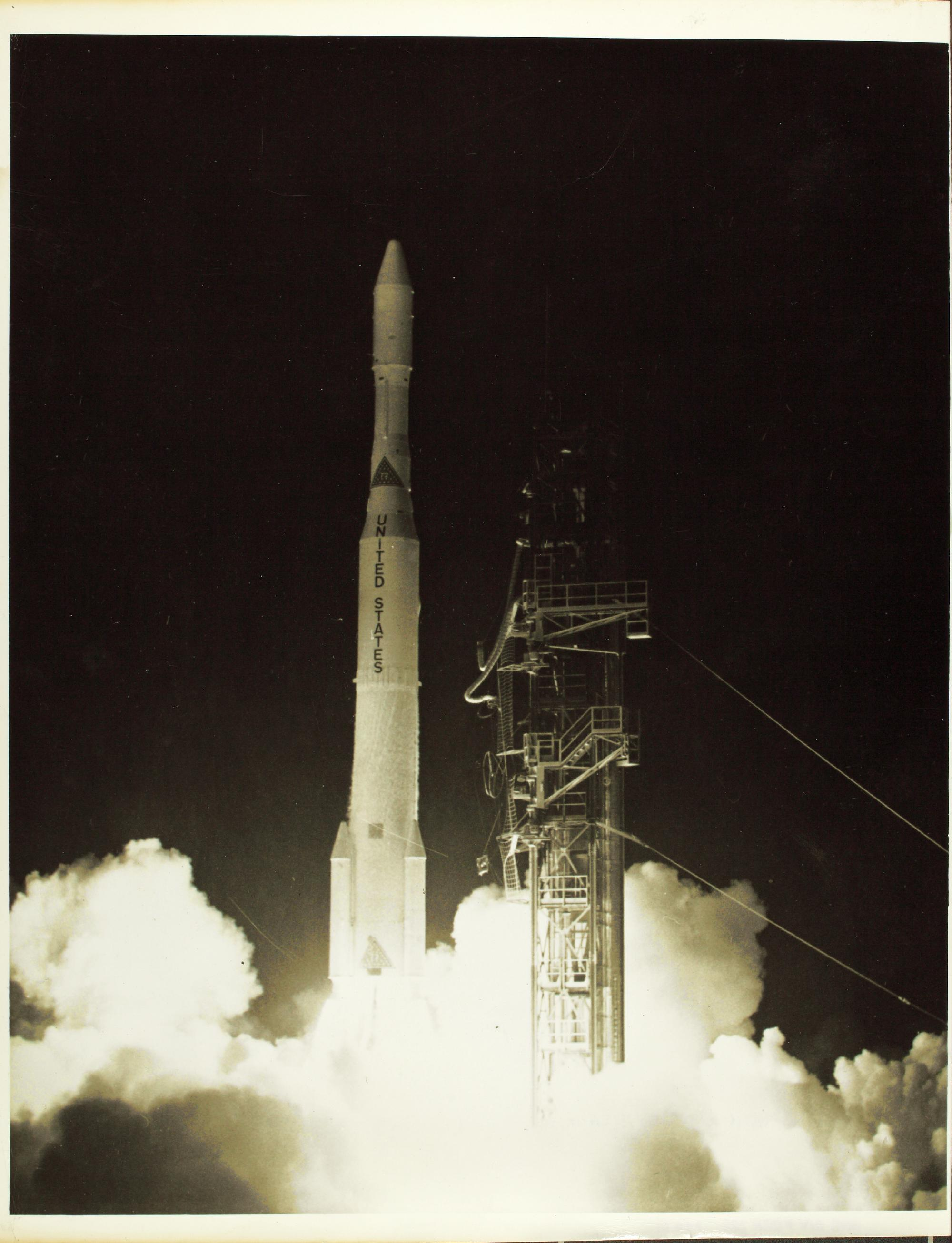
March 7, 1962: First Orbiting Solar Observatory launched by U.S.

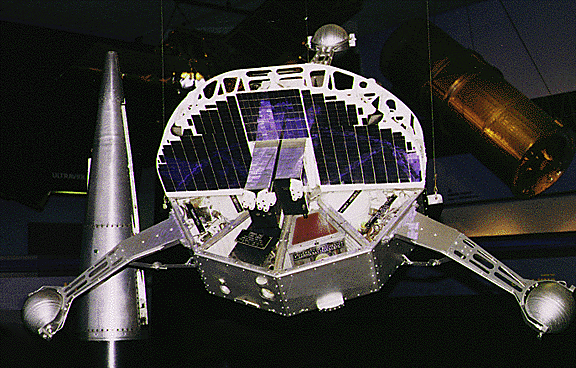
OSO I

March 3, 1962: United Kingdom claims slice of Antarctica

The following events occurred in March 1962:

== March 1, 1962 (Thursday) ==
- The largest ticker-tape parade in history took place in New York City as an estimated 4 million well-wishers turned out to salute American astronaut John Glenn. The city sanitation department collected 3,474 tonnes (3,419 long tons; 3,829 short tons) of tossed paper afterward, compared to an average of 50 tonnes (49 long tons; 55 short tons) for parades in the 21st century. "John Glenn Day" also included Mayor Robert F. Wagner Jr. presenting Glenn and Robert R. Gilruth with the city's Medal of Honor.
- The first test of another nation's nuclear weapon in the United States took place when the United Kingdom was allowed to perform an underground test of a 9,500-ton bomb at the Nevada Test Site.
- Marvel Comics introduced "The Incredible Hulk" as the first issue of the comic book, by that name, on the shelves of U.S. stores and newsstands. Issue #1 was post-dated to May 1962 in accordance with industry practice.
- The very first Kmart discount store was opened by the S.S. Kresge Corporation in the United States in Garden City, Michigan. Kresge CEO Harry Cunningham founded and oversaw the growth of what would be the largest chain of American discount stores by 1964. In 1990, Kmart would yield its #1 spot to Walmart, also founded in 1962.
- All 95 people aboard American Airlines Flight 1 were killed when the Boeing 707, crashed shortly after its 10:07 a.m. takeoff from Idlewild Airport at New York. The dead included W. Alton Jones, philanthropist and chairman of the board of Cities Service Company (now CITGO). An investigation concluded that the crash was caused by a rudder malfunction, which sent the plane into an uncontrolled roll resulting in loss of control.
- A three-story hotel collapsed in the Egyptian city of Asyut, killing 34 people who were eating after sunset on Eid ul-Fitr, a feast celebrating the end of the fasting of the month of Ramadan on the Islamic calendar. Seven survivors were recovered alive from the rubble.
- Benedicto Kiwanuka became the interim Prime Minister of Uganda as the United Kingdom granted the African colony self-government. He would be replaced by Milton Obote the next month, before Uganda's independence on October 9, and would later be murdered by Ugandan President Idi Amin in 1972.
- Pakistan's President Ayub Khan promulgated a new constitution designed to reinforce his authority in the absence of martial law.
- The Manned Spacecraft Center officially moved from Virginia's Langley Field to Houston, Texas.
- The final section of the Cahill Expressway opened in Sydney, Australia.

== March 2, 1962 (Friday) ==
- Wilt Chamberlain set a professional basketball record, still standing 50 years later, by scoring 100 points in an NBA game in Hershey, Pennsylvania, where his Philadelphia Warriors were playing the New York Knickerbockers. Chamberlain broke the previous record of 78, which he had set in January, hitting 36 field goals and 28 foul shots. The Warriors' 169–147 over the Knicks set a record for most points (316) scored by both teams in a game. A crowd of 4,124 witnessed the event.
- In a nationally broadcast address, U.S. President John F. Kennedy announced that the United States would resume atmospheric nuclear testing within six weeks unless the Soviet Union ceased above-ground testing while pursuing the proposed Nuclear Test Ban Treaty. The U.S. would resume atmospheric testing on April 25 after the USSR continued. A limited test ban treaty would be signed on July 25, 1963.
- In Burma (now Myanmar), General Ne Win and the Burmese Army staged a nearly bloodless coup d'état against the civilian government of Prime Minister U Nu. U Nu was arrested, along with the nation's president, the Chief Justice, and five of his cabinet members. Ne Win would rule the nation until his retirement in 1988, and military rule continued.
- The Mercury astronauts were guests of the United Nations. John Glenn acted as spokesman during an informal reception given by Acting Secretary-General U Thant.
- One of the most famous episodes of The Twilight Zone, "To Serve Man", was first shown on television.
- Born:
  - Jon Bon Jovi (stage name for John Francis Bongiovi Jr.), American singer for the rock band Bon Jovi (inducted into the UK and the U.S. Rock and Roll Hall of Fame0, songwriter inducted into the Songwriters Hall of Fame, and film and TV actor; in Perth Amboy, New Jersey
  - Scott La Rock, American hip-hop disc jockey and music producer; as Scott Monroe Sterling in The Bronx (murdered, 1987)
  - Raimo Summanen, Finnish ice hockey player and national team coach; in Jyväskylä
- Died:
  - Walt Kiesling, 58, NFL player (and later Pittsburgh Steelers head coach), Pro Football Hall of Fame inductee, died of respiratory failure
  - Charles Jean de la Vallée Poussin, 95, Belgian mathematician known for proving the prime number theorem

== March 3, 1962 (Saturday) ==
- The United Kingdom designated all land south of 60°S latitude and between longitudes 20°W and 80°W as the British Antarctic Territory, making a claim to an area of 1,710,000 square kilometers or 660,000 square miles. In addition to the wedge of the Antarctic continent, the territory included the uninhabited South Orkney Islands and the South Shetland Islands, while putting South Georgia and the South Sandwich Islands under the jurisdiction of the Falkland Islands. The claim to the territories was not recognized by Argentina.
- Liu Cheng-sze, a second lieutenant in Communist China's air force, defected to Taiwan, bringing with him a Soviet-built MiG-15 jet fighter. Liu had broken away from a training mission, then flew the jet 200 miles (320 km) south and landed near Taipei, where he surrendered to the Nationalist Chinese Air Force. A parade was held in his honor on March 10, with 200,000 people turning out to honor him.
- Born:
  - Jackie Joyner-Kersee, American athlete who holds the world record for heptathlon (7291 pts) and Olympic record for long jump (7.40 m (24 ft 3 1/4 in)), both at the 1988 Summer Olympics; in East St. Louis, Illinois
  - Greg Lee, American comedian, actor and TV host known for Where in the World Is Carmen Sandiego?; in Hebron, Nebraska

== March 4, 1962 (Sunday) ==
- All 111 people on Caledonian Airways Flight 153 were killed when the Douglas DC-7, crashed into a jungle swamp near Douala in Cameroon, for the worst single plane crash in history up to that time. The flight had originated in Lourenço Marques (now Maputo) in Mozambique, making multiple stops with an eventual destination in Luxembourg City, and had taken off bound for Lisbon. The bodies of the victims, most of them British and South African tourists, were buried in a common grave.
- U.S. pilots Scott Carpenter and Walter Schirra began water-escape exercises in conjunction with helicopter pickups, after being selected as pilot and backup pilot, respectively, for May's Mercury 7 mission.
- The Eighteen Nation Disarmament Conference, which included non-nuclear powers in addition to the U.S., the USSR, the UK and France, opened in Geneva.
- NBN Television, the first regional commercial television station in New South Wales, was inaugurated.
- Born: Robb Armstrong, African-American comic strip artist known for Jump Start; in Philadelphia

== March 5, 1962 (Monday) ==
- A B-58 Hustler jet, piloted by U.S. Air Force Captain Robert Sowers, and a crew of two, set three new records by flying from Los Angeles to New York in 2 hours, 01:15, then back again in 2 hours, 15:02. The sonic boom, from the jet's speed of more than 1,000 miles per hour (1,600 km/h), broke windows in Riverside, California, and Chillicothe, Missouri, when it accelerated at 30,000 feet (9,100 m) and during a refueling, and emergency calls were made in cities beneath the flight path. The USAF received more than 10,000 complaints as a result of the flight.
- Giorgio Borġ Olivier became Prime Minister of Malta for the second time, following the return to power of his Nationalist Party in February elections. Mr. Borg Olivier had served previously from 1950 to 1955. Olivier served for nine years until 1971.
- At the 19th Golden Globe Awards, The Guns of Navarone, A Majority of One and West Side Story all won film awards. Other winners included Maximilian Schell, Glenn Ford, Geraldine Page, and Rosalind Russell.
- Westinghouse Electric Corporation was awarded a $6.8 million subcontract for the rendezvous radar and transponder system for the Gemini spacecraft, designed to locate and track the target vehicle during rendezvous maneuvers, and a transponder on the Agena target vehicle itself.
- Born: Robert Curbeam, African-American astronaut who served on four space shuttle missions; in Baltimore
- Died: Otakar Jeremiáš, 69, Czech composer

== March 6, 1962 (Tuesday) ==
- Rated by the U.S. Geological Survey as "The most destructive storm ever to hit the mid-Atlantic states" of the U.S., and as one of the ten worst U.S. storms in the 20th century, the Ash Wednesday Storm of 1962 began forming off the coast of North Carolina and continued for three days as it moved up the Eastern seaboard as far as New York. Heavy winds and rain coincided with a perigean spring tide, when a new Moon occurred when the Moon was making its closest approach to the Earth. The combined tugging of Moon and Sun made the tides higher than normal. Forty people were killed and $500,000,000 of damage was incurred.
- In a joint statement issued by U.S. Secretary of State Dean Rusk and Thailand's Foreign Minister Thanat Khoman, the United States pledged to go to war to defend against any attack on Thailand by Communist guerillas.
- U.S. Patent #3,023,527 was granted to Wayne Leek and Charles Morse for the Remington Nylon 66, a rifle which required no added lubricants because the stock was made of the nylon variant Zytel.
- Atlas rocket 107-D was delivered to Cape Canaveral for the Mercury 7 mission to be launched in May with Scott Carpenter.
- Born: Bengt Baron, Swedish swimmer and 1980 Olympic gold medalist; in Finspång

== March 7, 1962 (Wednesday) ==
- In London, the Royal College of Physicians issued its report, "Smoking and Health", declaring that "Cigarette smoking is a cause of lung cancer. It also causes bronchitis and probably contributes to the development of coronary heart disease and various other less common diseases. It delays healing of gastric and duodenal ulcers." Sir Robert Platt, the president of the organization, led a committee of nine physicians to compile the research. A panel led by the U.S. Surgeon General would draw a similar conclusion nearly two years later on January 11, 1964.
- OSO I, the first of nine Orbiting Solar Observatory satellites, launched by the United States, was launched from Cape Canaveral and put into orbit around the Earth, to measure radiation from the Sun. OSO I performed remarkably well in conducting the 13 different experiments for which it was programmed. Especially relevant to human spaceflight were its measurements of solar radiation in high frequency ranges, of cosmic dust effects, and of the thermal properties of spacecraft surface materials.
- McDonnell awarded a $6.5 million subcontract to Minneapolis-Honeywell Regulator Company to provide the attitude control and maneuvering electronics system for the Gemini spacecraft. The Gemini Project Office accepted McDonnell's preliminary design of the spacecraft's main undercarriage for use in land landings and authorized McDonnell to proceed with testing to start on April 1.
- The Tipsport Arena opened in Prague, as the Sportovni Hala Praha. In addition to concerts and entertainment, it is the host to the ice hockey team HC Sparta Praha.

== March 8, 1962 (Thursday) ==
- American drug manufacturer Richardson-Merrell Pharmaceuticals withdrew its request for the U.S. Food and Drug Administration to approve the prescription of thalidomide, which the company had developed under the name Kelvadon. On the same day, the company withdrew the drug from sale in Canada. American marketing of the medicine, which had caused severe birth defects in 15,000 babies, primarily in West Germany, had been blocked by FDA reviewer Frances Oldham Kelsey, who was later given an award by President Kennedy.
- The Beatles made their radio debut, with a three-song session, recorded the day before, and broadcast on the BBC Manchester programme Teenager's Turn (Here We Go). They performed the songs "Dream Baby (How Long Must I Dream)", "Please Mr. Postman", and "Memphis, Tennessee".
- A Turkish Airlines Fairchild F-27 crashed into the Taurus Mountains while on approach to Adana Airport, killing all 11 people on board.
- The MSC directed North American Aviation to develop an emergency parachute recovery system for the Paraglider Development Program and authorized North American to subcontract the emergency recovery system to Northrop's Radioplane Division for $225,000. North American also subcontracted $227,000 to Goodyear Tire and Rubber Company to study materials and test fabrics for inflatable structures.
- Born: Kim Ung-yong, South Korean engineer and former child prodigy listed by Guinness for "Highest IQ", with a measured intelligence quotient of 210; in Seoul

== March 9, 1962 (Friday) ==
- Three babies at the Binghamton General Hospital in Binghamton, New York, United States, died suddenly of heart failure. Three more were dead the next day, with four others in critical condition, and all had abnormally high sodium levels. The deaths of the six infants, three boys and three girls who ranged in age from 3 days to 8 months old, were traced to a nurse's mistaken placement of salt, three days earlier, into a sugar container used for the making of baby formula. Ironically, the discovery was made by another nurse who broke hospital rules when she made herself a cup of coffee in the formula room. The deaths were subsequently ruled as accidental.
- In the second deadly mine explosion in West Germany in as many months, 29 underground coal miners were killed at the Saachen mine near Hamm.

== March 10, 1962 (Saturday) ==
- Newly independent from France, the Kingdom of Morocco adopted its first constitution.
- Scottish football club Kilmarnock's home attendance record was broken when a crowd of 35,995 turned out to see them play Glasgow Rangers in the Scottish Cup, at the Rugby Park stadium.
- Born: Seiko Matsuda, Japanese pop singer and songwriter; in Kurume, Fukuoka
- Died: John Henry Turpin, 85, African-American U.S. Navy officer and one of the last survivors of the 1898 explosion and sinking of the U.S. Navy cruiser USS Maine

== March 11, 1962 (Sunday) ==
- Burdened with debts, the Accrington Stanley soccer football team was dropped from England's Football League before the end of the 1961–62 season. The team's final game had been against Crewe Alexandra F.C. on March 4.
- Jackie Kennedy, the First Lady of the United States, had a 33-minute-long audience with Pope John XXIII in Rome, one of the longest private audiences ever granted by the Pope. She left that evening for a visit to India.

== March 12, 1962 (Monday) ==
- Mars Rafikov, one of the original 20 Soviet cosmonauts, was arrested for public intoxication, along with Ivan Anikeyev. Rafikov, who had been reprimanded on several other occasions, was dismissed from the program on March 14.
- Cuba began the rationing of rice, beans, and lard throughout the nation, and of beef, chicken, fish, eggs, and milk in Havana, and introduced the "libreta", literally the "little book", of rationing coupons for families.
- The "Franc Zone" was created among former French African colonies that had become independent nations, with France managing their economic policies, treasuries, and currencies.
- Born:
  - Chris Sanders, American animator, director, screenwriter, producer, illustrator, and voice actor who directed Lilo & Stitch and How to Train Your Dragon; in Colorado Springs
  - Darryl Strawberry, American baseball player, 1983 Rookie of the Year and 1988 home run leader in the National League; in Los Angeles
- Died: John McCuish, 55, who served as Governor of Kansas for 11 days from January 3 to 14, 1957

== March 13, 1962 (Tuesday) ==
- U.S. Army General L. L. Lemnitzer, Chairman of the Joint Chiefs of Staff, presented Operation Northwoods, a top-secret proposal to use American funding for terror attacks within the United States, to U.S. Secretary of Defense Robert McNamara. With the goal of carrying out violent acts that could be blamed on the Communist government in Cuba in order to get support for an invasion, the proposals included exploding an empty U.S. Navy ship in Guantanamo Bay and creating a false list of casualties; and faking an attack, to be blamed on Cuba, on a chartered airliner flying from the United States. The most incredible proposal was to simulate a "Communist Cuban terror campaign in the Miami area, other Florida cities, and even in Washington", including "exploding a few plastic bombs in carefully chosen spots", and directed against Cuban refugees "even to the point of wounding." McNamara vetoed the plan, which would be declassified in 2001, before it reached President Kennedy.
- Wing Luke, a native of China who moved to the United States as a child, was elected as the first non-white person to serve on the city council of Seattle, and the first Asian American to hold an elective office in the State of Washington. Luke would serve until May 17, 1965, when he was killed in a plane crash.

== March 14, 1962 (Wednesday) ==
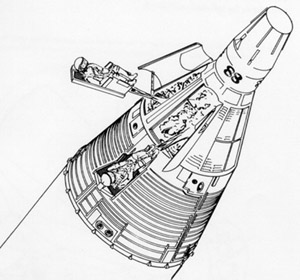
Use of ejection seats to escape from the Gemini spacecraft

- NASA set specifications for the ejection seat for the Gemini spacecraft, directing that the seats to be operated manually, and that both seats had to eject simultaneously if either system was activated. McDonnell awarded a $1.8 million subcontract to Weber Aircraft for the Gemini ejection seats on April 9 and a $741,000 subcontract to Rocket Power, Inc. on May 15 for the escape system rocket catapult.
- On the same day, the MSC revised the Gemini program schedule to increase the number of test vehicles. The first uncrewed qualification flight (Gemini 1 was still scheduled for July 1963, though it would be postponed later to April 8, 1964. The first crewed flight (Gemini 3, with Gus Grissom and John L. Young was postponed to late October 1963. It would be launched on March 23, 1965. Gemini 6, the first flight that would use the Agena target vehicle, was delayed to April 1964, though Agena's first launch attempt on October 25, 1965 would fail.
- Edward M. "Teddy" Kennedy, the 30-year-old brother of U.S. President John F. Kennedy and U.S. Attorney General Robert F. Kennedy, announced his candidacy for the Democratic nomination for the United States Senate seat that had been held by JFK. The incumbent, Benjamin A. Smith II, was a Kennedy family friend who had been appointed to fill the seat until a special election could be scheduled. Ted Kennedy, who had to wait until his 30th birthday, on February 22, to become eligible, would win the primary and general election, and then re-election in 1964, 1970, 1976, 1982, 1988, 1994, 2000 and 2006, serving for almost 47 years until his death in 2009.
- Tony Jackson of the Chicago Majors scored 12 three-point baskets, as part of the short-lived American Basketball League, which pioneered the rule for shots from more than 25 feet (7.6 m) away. Jackson's pro record for most treys, set in a 124–122 loss to the Cleveland Pipers, tied in 2003 and 2005, would be surpassed on October 29, 2018 by Klay Thompson of the Golden State Warriors with 14 three-pointers in a 149–124 win over the Chicago Bulls.

== March 15, 1962 (Thursday) ==
- In an address to a joint session of the U.S. Congress and a milestone in the history of consumer protection, President Kennedy asked for the passage of the "Consumer Bill of Rights". The President listed four basic rights that should be guaranteed by the federal government to American purchasers of goods and services— the right to safety, the right to be informed, the right to choose and the right to be heard. After being passed into law, the idea would be taken up worldwide and serve as the inspiration for the United Nations Guidelines for Consumer Protection.
- Three months before he was scheduled to be launched into space, NASA Headquarters publicly announced that U.S. astronaut Donald K. "Deke" Slayton was grounded after having been diagnosed with a heart murmur. One of the original "Mercury Seven", Slayton would be replaced by Scott Carpenter on the May launch of Aurora 7. In 1975, Slayton would finally go into outer space on the Apollo–Soyuz Test Project.
- U.S. President Kennedy signed the Manpower Development and Training Act of 1962 into law, after it passed 60–31 in the U.S. Senate and 354–62 in the House.
- Katangan Prime Minister Moise Tshombe began negotiations for the breakaway State of Katanga to end its secession and to rejoin the Congo.
- Born: Michael Smerconish, American radio host, political commentator and attorney; in Doylestown, Pennsylvania
- Died:
  - Mouloud Feraoun, 48, Algerian novelist, was shot dead after he and five colleagues were kidnapped by the OAS paramilitary group
  - Arthur Compton, 69, American physicist and 1927 Nobel Prize laureate for his discovery of the Compton effect

== March 16, 1962 (Friday) ==
- Flying Tiger Line Flight 739, a Lockheed Constellation airliner carrying 96 Army personnel and a crew of 11 to the Philippines, disappeared at 1:30 a.m. local time (1530 GMT on March 15) after taking off from Guam. Despite a massive search of the Pacific Ocean, no trace of the airliner, nor the 107 people on board, was ever found.
- Kosmos 1, the first of a series of earth-orbiting satellites from the Soviet space program, was launched. Kosmos 1000 would be sent up in 1978, and Kosmos 2000 in 1989. Over the first fifty years, 2479 of the series would be launched.
- The U.S. Air Force made its first test launch of a Titan II intercontinental ballistic missile. The launch was successful, as the missile flew 5,000 miles (8,000 km) out over the Atlantic Ocean.
- In Operation Swallow, following a series of Syrian attacks on Israeli fishermen in the Sea of Galilee, the Israel Defense Forces raided Syrian posts in the village of Nokyeab. During the operation 53 Syrian and seven Israeli soldiers were killed.
- The University of the Virgin Islands was chartered, as Virgin Islands College.

== March 17, 1962 (Saturday) ==
- The annual Gaelic Games competition was televised for the first time, as RTÉ broadcast the finals of the Railway Cup, hurling championship of the Gaelic Athletic Association. Leinster beat defending champion Munster by a score of 1 goal, 11 points to 1 goal, nine points, equivalent to 14–12.
- Nari Contractor, captain of the India national cricket team, suffered a career-ending and near-fatal injury while batting in a match at Bridgetown in Barbados when a pitched ball fractured his skull. The injury led to the use of headgear by cricket teams.
- American company McDonnell Aircraft Corporation awarded AiResearch a $5.5 million subcontract to provide the reactant supply system for the Gemini spacecraft fuel cells.
- Marking St. Patrick's Day, Ireland's President Éamon de Valera and Mrs. Sinéad de Valera had a private audience with Pope John XXIII in Rome.
- A Clockwork Orange, a British dystopian novel by Anthony Burgess, is published.
- Born:
  - Kalpana Chawla, Indian-born American astronaut and aerospace engineer who was one of the seven crew members who died in the Space Shuttle Columbia disaster when the spacecraft disintegrated during its re-entry into the Earth's atmosphere; in Karnal, East Punjab
  - Roustam Tariko, Russian vodka magnate; in Menzelinsk, Tatarstan
- Died: Wilhelm Blaschke, 76, German mathematician

== March 18, 1962 (Sunday) ==
- Representatives of France and of the Front de Libération Nationale (FLN) leading the independence movement in Algeria signed the Évian Accords, an agreement in Évian-les-Bains ending the Algerian War. Krim Belkacem and Saad Dahlab negotiated for the FLN, while the Minister for Algerian Affairs, Louis Joxe, appeared for France. Krim successfully resisted a threatened partition of Algeria into European and Arab sections, as well as a plan to give dual citizenship to European Algerians, while Joxe was able to secure French military bases in the former overseas department. The agreement would be approved by 91% of French voters and nearly 100% of Algerian voters in separate referendums, and Algeria would become independent on July 3.
- "Un premier amour", sung by Isabelle Aubret (music by Claude Henri Vic, lyrics by Roland Stephane Valade), won the Eurovision Song Contest 1962 for France.
- Born: Patrice Trovoada, Prime Minister of São Tomé and Príncipe for four months in 2008; in Libreville, Gabon, as the son of former Premier and President Miguel Trovoada

== March 19, 1962 (Monday) ==
- After more than seven years of fighting between the French Army and the Algerian FLN, a ceasefire was declared in the Algerian War at noon local time pursuant to Article 1 of the Évian Accords. Sporadic fighting continued in Saint-Denis-du-Sig (now Sig), where 52 people were killed in fighting between Muslim crowds and a Muslim unit of the French Army.
- Columbia Records released Bob Dylan, the debut album of the singer-songwriter of the same name. The record would sell only a few hundred copies in its first six months. The next year, Dylan would become famous with the best-selling album The Freewheelin' Bob Dylan.
- Resolution 83-A took effect in Cuba, outlawing professional sports.
- Advanced Technology Laboratories, Inc. received a $3.2 million subcontract from McDonnell to provide the horizon sensor system for the Gemini spacecraft, while Thiokol Chemical Corporation was awarded a $400,000 subcontract to provide the retrograde rockets for the Gemini spacecraft.
- Died:
  - Samuel Cate Prescott, 89, American food scientist and pioneer in food preservation
  - Vasily Dzhugashvili, 40, son of Joseph Stalin, disgraced former general and sportsman

== March 20, 1962 (Tuesday) ==
- At an extraordinary session of the National Assembly, French deputies and senators approved the statements made by the President of the Republic, Charles de Gaulle, and by the government following the signing of the Évian Accords on Algeria.
- Defying the ceasefire between the French Army and the Algerian FLN guerillas, the dissident European Algerian group, the OAS fired five mortar shells into a crowd of civilians at the Casbah in Algiers, killing four and wounding 67 people.
- The U.S. town of Woodruff Place, Indiana, incorporated in 1876, came to an end as a separate town after the United States Supreme Court declined to review a state court decision that allowed the area to be annexed by Indianapolis.
- Mercury spacecraft No. 19, the latest in the U.S. human spaceflight program, was delivered to Cape Canaveral in the orbital-manned configuration, but this mission would be canceled after the successful six-orbit flight of Wally Schirra.
- Died: Stan Wootton, 66, Australian rules footballer and cricketer

== March 21, 1962 (Wednesday) ==
- Yun Po Sun resigned as President of South Korea, after unsuccessfully protesting the decision of the military government to require approval of any candidates for political office.
- The first franchise in the Taco Bell multinational restaurant chain was opened by entrepreneur Glen Bell in Downey, California.
- Canada became the final nation to ban the birth-defect-causing drug thalidomide.
- The U.S. Air Force Space Systems Division awarded a contract to Aerojet-General Corporation for the research, development, and procurement of 15 propulsion systems for the Gemini launch vehicle. The final engine was scheduled for delivery by April 1965.
- McDonnell Aircraft awarded a $4,475,000 subcontract to Motorola, Inc. to design and build the digital command system (DCS) for the Gemini spacecraft.
- English actor Rex Harrison married Welsh actress Rachel Roberts. The two Britons were wed in a civil ceremony in Italy at Genoa.
- Born:
  - Rosie O'Donnell, American comedian, actress, and TV talk show host; in Commack, New York
  - Matthew Broderick, American film and stage actor; in New York City

== March 22, 1962 (Thursday) ==
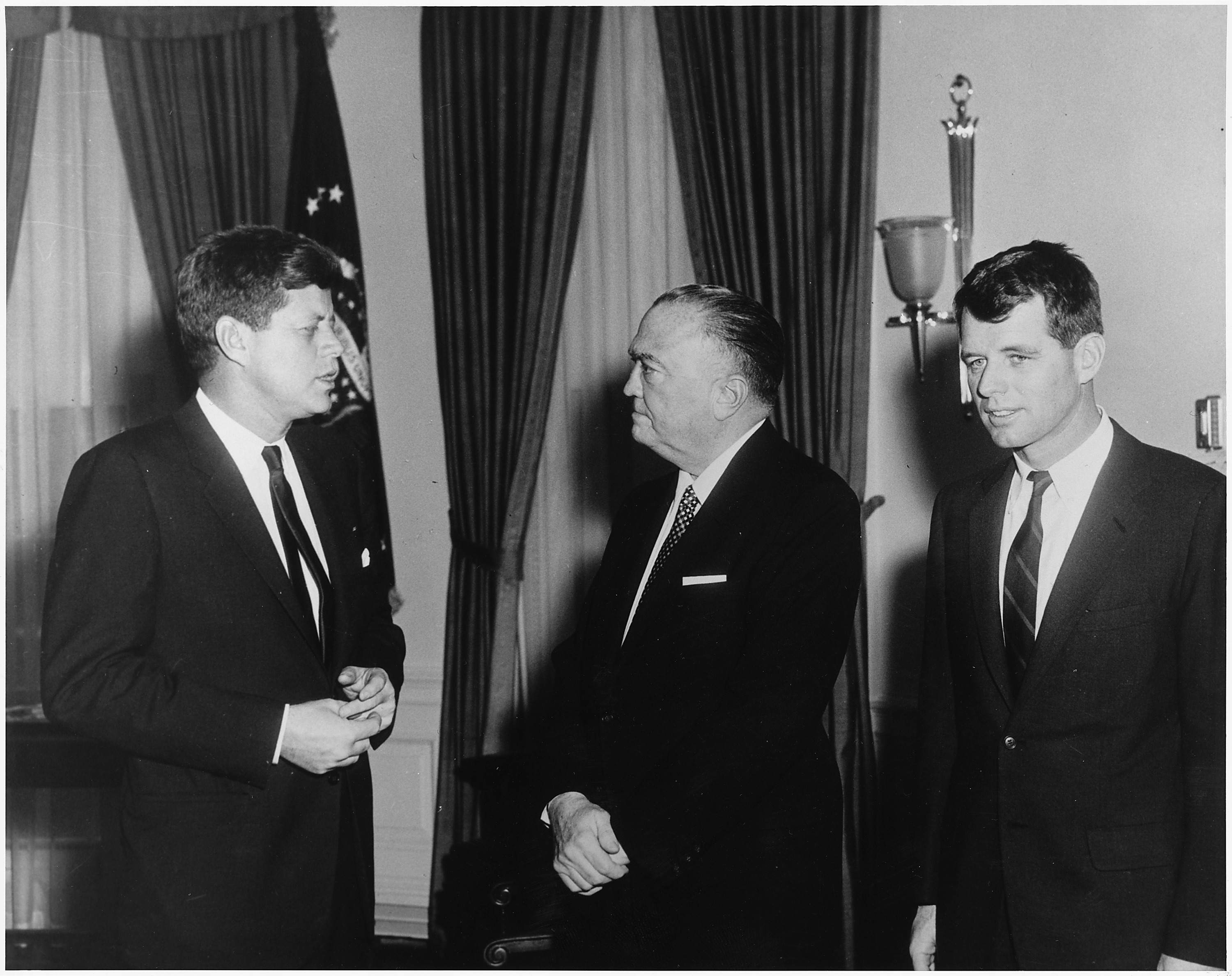
JFK, Hoover and RFK in February 1961

- FBI Director J. Edgar Hoover met at the White House with John F. Kennedy, to advise him about what findings from a wiretap revealed. Not only was Hoover aware that President Kennedy was conducting an extramarital affair with Judith Exner, Hoover advised that Ms. Exner was also romantically involved with organized crime figures Sam Giancana and Johnny Roselli, and with Frank Sinatra. After the meeting, Kennedy called Exner to terminate the relationship. The affair would not become public knowledge until Congressional hearings were held in 1975.
- As part of the Evian Accords, France and Algeria granted a general amnesty to Algerian nationalists who "aided or abetted the Algerian insurrection" and to French and Algerian servicemen who "have committed infractions during the maintenance of order against the Algerian insurrection". On June 17, 1966, France would extend the amnesty to OAS members who "committed infractions against state security during the events in Algeria".
- Having moved to the Soviet Union, Lee Harvey Oswald received a March 7 notice advising that his discharge from the U.S. Marines had been changed from "honorable" to "undesirable" and wrote an unsuccessful protest to the U.S. Department of Defense.
- Adolf Eichmann began an appeal to an Israeli court, as his lawyer, Robert Servatius, sought to spare Eichmann from the death sentence ordered in his 1961 war crimes conviction. The verdict would be upheld, and Eichmann would be executed on May 31.

== March 23, 1962 (Friday) ==
- In Vancouver, British chemist Neil Bartlett created the first noble gas compound when he created xenon hexafluoroplatinate (XePtF_{6}) from a reaction of xenon and platinum hexafluoride.
- The Air Force Space Systems Division published the "Development Plan for the Gemini Launch Vehicle System". From experience in Titan II and Mercury programs, the planners estimated a budget of $164,400,000, including a 50% contingency for cost increases and unforeseen changes.
- Louis Joxe, France's Minister for Algerian Affairs, broadcast on radio to clarify the substance of the Franco-Algerian Accords signed in Évian five days previously, as well as the future outlook for Algeria.
- The Scandinavian States of the Nordic Council signed the Helsinki Convention on Nordic Co-operation.
- Born:
  - Bassel al-Assad, eldest son and expected successor of Syrian President Hafez al-Assad until his death in a car accident in 1994; in Damascus
  - Sir Steve Redgrave, English Olympic rower; in Marlow, Buckinghamshire

== March 24, 1962 (Saturday) ==
- World welterweight boxing champion Benny Paret of Cuba lost his title to former champion Emile Griffith of the U.S. Virgin Islands in a bout at Madison Square Garden in New York City. In the 12th round, Griffith unleashed a torrent of punches as Paret was on the ropes, and referee Ruby Goldstein stopped the fight. Peret sagged, then collapsed. Paret, who had knocked down Griffith at the end of the sixth round, was taken to Roosevelt Hospital, where he underwent emergency brain surgery. He never regained consciousness and died on April 2.
- The Cincinnati Bearcats defeated the Ohio State Buckeyes, 71 to 59, to win the NCAA basketball tournament.
- At the conclusion of the All England Badminton Championships, Erland Kops of Denmark emerged as the Men's Singles champion, while his compatriots Finn Kobberø and Jørgen Hammergaard Hansen won gold in Men's Doubles. Kobberø also won the gold in Mixed Doubles, with Ulla Strand. Judy Hashman of the United States won both the Women's Singles and the Women's Doubles - with Tonny Holst-Christensen of Denmark.
- Born: Rajeev Motwani, Indian-American theoretical computer scientist (d. 2009); in Jammu

== March 25, 1962 (Sunday) ==
- Edmond Jouhaud, former General of the French Army who had become second-in-command of the European Algerian OAS, was arrested in Oran. It was not until six hours after his capture that police discovered that Messr. Gerberd was actually General Jouhaud. OAS Commander Raoul Salan remained at large.
- In the Liechtenstein general election for all 15 seats of the Landtag, the Progressive Citizens' Party (FBP) lost its 9 to 6 lead to the Patriotic Union (VU) but retained its majority of 8 to 7 in the won most seats, and continued its coalition with the VU.
- The 24th Gent–Wevelgem cycle race took place in Belgium and was won by Rik Van Looy.
- Died: Auguste Piccard, 78, Swiss physicist and explorer

== March 26, 1962 (Monday) ==
- In Baker v. Carr, the U.S. Supreme Court ruled, 6–2, that federal courts could order state legislatures to reapportion seats. In doing so, the Court overturned its 1946 ruling, in Colegrove v. Green, that it had no jurisdiction to decide redistricting disputes were political issues. Within a year after the ruling, lawsuits had been filed in 36 states to redraw the legislative maps.
- After having withdrawn from public view for several months, Cuban Premier Fidel Castro went on television to denounce Anibal Escalante, who had been a high-ranking official of the Cuban Communist Party. Escalante, whom Castro accused of "sectarianism" and using the Party to further his personal ambition, was fired the next day.
- Hundreds of European settlers in Algeria staged a peaceful march in Algiers to protest against the sealing off of their neighborhood at Bab El Oued. As they approached French Army barricades, fighting broke out, leaving 51 dead, mostly European, and 130 wounded.
- France shortened the term for mandatory military service for eligible men from 26 months to 18.

== March 27, 1962 (Tuesday) ==
- New York State Governor Nelson Rockefeller signed legislation to allow the Port of New York Authority to begin construction of the World Trade Center in Manhattan.
- Born: Jann Arden, Canadian singer-songwriter; in Springbank, Alberta
- Died: Augusta Savage, 70, African-American sculptor

== March 28, 1962 (Wednesday) ==
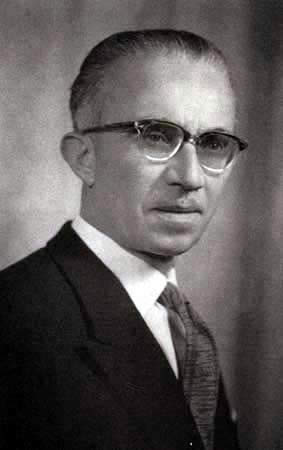
Syrian President al-Kudsi, arrested

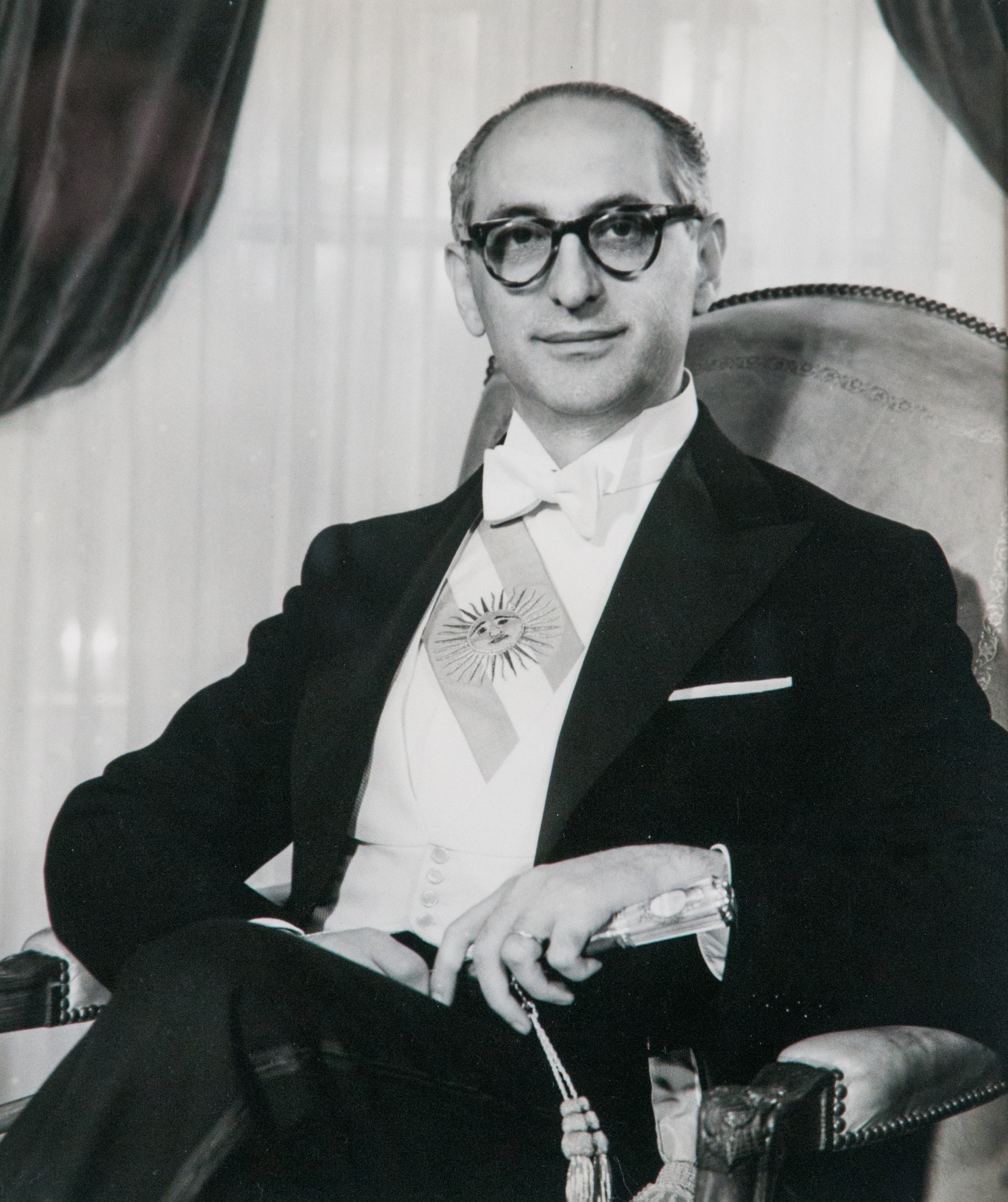
Argentine President Frondizi, overthrown

- Nazim al-Kudsi, the President of Syria, was arrested along with Prime Minister Maarouf al-Dawalibi, following an Army-led coup. To avert a possible civil war, the Army junta resigned on April 13, released Kudsi, and restored him to the presidency.
- After an 11-day showdown with the Argentine armed forces over the gains of Peronists in the March 18 elections, President Arturo Frondizi was forced to resign. Frondizi, who had reportedly avoided overthrow in 25 previous coups d'état, was arrested at his home and then flown to a military base on Martín García Island. Two days later, Senate President José María Guido would be approved by the armed forces as the new president.
- The McDonnell Corporation awarded a $2,500,000 subcontract to Collins Radio Company for voice communications systems for the Gemini spacecraft.
- Died: Robert Neyland, 70, former U.S. Army Brigadier General and long time (1926 to 1953) football coach of the University of Tennessee, including the 1951 college football championship ranking. Neyland received the Distinguished Service Medal during World War II and was an inductee into the National College Football Hall of Fame. Tennessee's Neyland Stadium, with more than 100,000 seats, would be named in his honor.

== March 29, 1962 (Thursday) ==
- U.S. Comedian Jack Paar concluded his last appearance as host of The Jack Paar Show, then known informally as The Tonight Show on NBC, after five years. The guests on the last show were Jack E. Leonard, Alexander King, Robert Merrill and Buddy Hackett. Among those appearing in taped farewell messages were Richard Nixon, Robert Kennedy, Billy Graham, Bob Hope and Jack Benny. Hugh Downs was the announcer, and Jose Melis led the band. The show would continue as The Tonight Show the following week, with guest hosts, until Johnny Carson took over on October 1, 1962. Paar's last regular appearance was on a Thursday. On the next day, the final show was a "Best Of Paar" rerun.
- U.S. Supreme Court Justice Charles Evans Whittaker resigned due to poor health. The next day, President Kennedy nominated former college and pro football player Byron "Whizzer" White, the Deputy Attorney General of the United States, to succeed Charles Whittaker.
- Honeywell received an $18,000,000 subcontract from McDonnell to provide the inertial measuring unit (IMU) for the Gemini spacecraft, to provide a stable reference for determining spacecraft attitude and to indicate changes in spacecraft velocity.
- The conveying of a life peerage on British Conservative MP Sir Ian Macdonald Horobin was announced. Two weeks later he would withdrew his acceptance and would be subsequently jailed for an indecency offence.
- The Danish cargo ship Kirsten Skou collided with a West German ship, Karpfanger, in the English Channel and sank. Luckily, all 35 crew members were rescued.

== March 30, 1962 (Friday) ==
- Ted Kennedy, running for the U.S. Senate seat vacated by his older brother, President John F. Kennedy, disclosed that he had been required to drop out of Harvard University in 1951, after having cheated on a freshman examination. Nevertheless, the younger Kennedy would win the 1962 primary and general elections, and be re-elected for more terms by Massachusetts voters.
- Martin-Baltimore submitted a "Description of the Launch Vehicle for the Gemini Spacecraft" to Air Force Space Systems Division. This document laid the foundation for the design of the Gemini launch vehicle by defining the concept and philosophy of each proposed subsystem.
- Born: MC Hammer (stage name for Stanley Kirk Burrell), American rapper and dancer, best known for his 1990 hit "U Can't Touch This"; in Oakland, California

== March 31, 1962 (Saturday) ==
- The 494-member Lok Sabha, the lower house of the Parliament of India adjourned its final session, to make way for the new Lok Sabha, elected in February, to be inaugurated in April.
- A tornado killed 15 people in the city of Milton, Florida, and injured more than 75.
- The McDonnell Aircraft Company formally froze further changes in the configuration of the Gemini spacecraft, and the specifications were submitted to NASA and approved.
- The Whitecliffs Branch Railway, serving the Canterbury region of New Zealand's South Island, was closed.
