= K. Visalini =

Indian prodigy

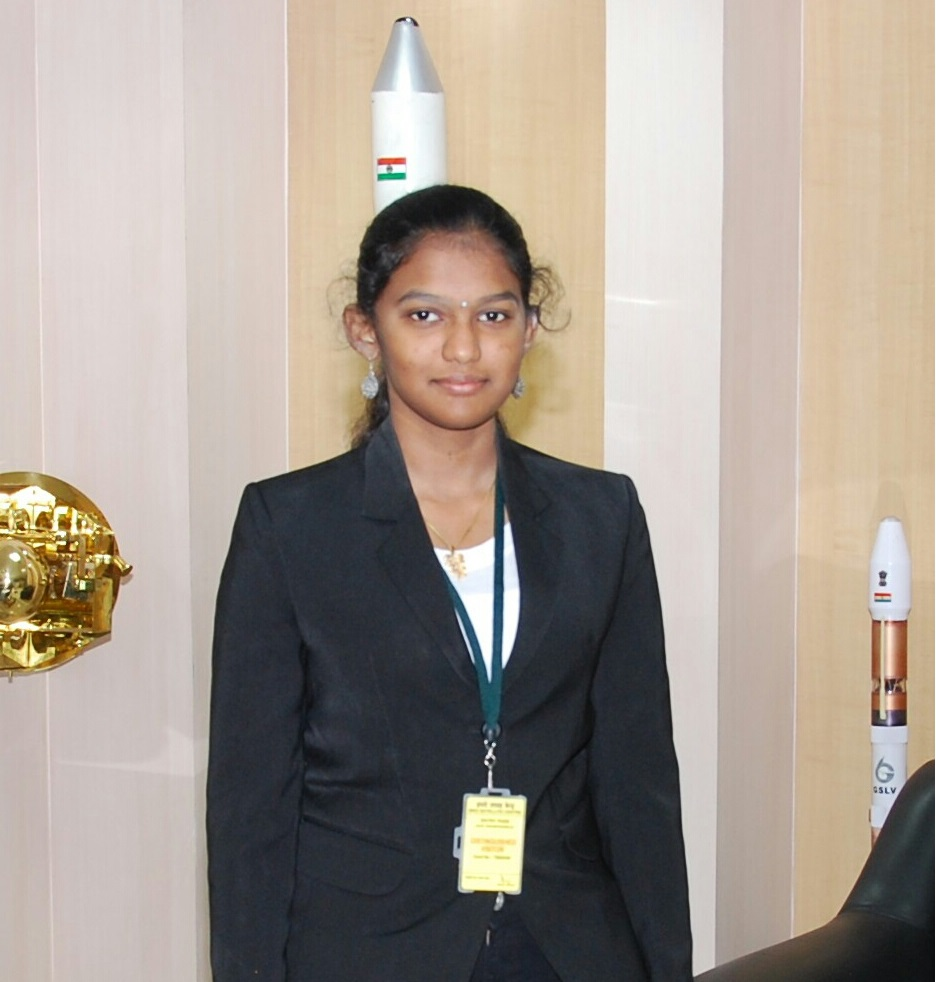
- Born: May 23, 2000 (age 26); Tirunelveli, Tamil Nadu, India
- Education: Kalasalingam Academy of Research and Education (BTech, PhD)
- Known for: Highest Verified IQ of 225; Youngest CCNA certificate holder
- Website: www.kvisalini.com

K. Visalini (born 23 May 2000) is an Indian prodigy who is purported to have an officially tested IQ of 225. Visalini also holds several other records including the youngest person to receive CCNA and EXIN cloud computing certifications. She has been the chief guest and keynote speaker at many conferences, including TEDxNITKSurakthal.

== Early life ==
Visalini was born in Tirunelveli, in Tamil Nadu, India, in 2000. Her father, Kalyana Kumarasamy, worked as an electrician and her mother, Sethu Ragamaliga, as an announcer with All India Radio.

Visalini was born with ankyloglossia. During her mother's preparations for the Tamil Nadu Public Service Commission exams, her mother would often recite questions from the syllabus and their accompanying answers in the hopes that it would ameliorate Visalini's condition by encouraging echolalia.

== Education ==
During her schooling, Visalini was double promoted twice. Instead of continuing her ninth-grade education, she accepted an admission into the B.Tech. program at the Kalasalingam Academy of Research and Education. She participated in an accelerated program, allowing her to complete the B.E. program in three years as opposed to four.

She received an M.Tech. and Ph.D. in computer science and engineering at Kalasalingam Academy of Research and Education. Visalini speaks Tamil, English, Hindi, and Sanskrit. As of 2023, she is currently pursuing an M.A. in psychology at Indira Gandhi National Open University, India.

She is a Microsoft Certified Professional and Cisco Certified Network Associate. Visalini is the youngest person to receive CCNA certification and EXIN cloud computing certification.

== Career ==
She has been the chief guest and keynote speaker in many conferences, including TEDxNITKSurakthal and Computational Intelligence and Communication at SKR Engineering College.

She works in artificial intelligence and machine learning and has developed an algorithm that can predict and diagnose cancer and diabetes.
