= Kim Ung-yong =

South Korean engineer and professor (born 1962)

Kim Ung-Yong
- 김웅용
- Born: March 8, 1962 (age 64); Seoul, South Korea
- Education: Chungbuk National University (BS, MS, PhD); Cheongju University (MS)
- Scientific career
- Fields: Civil engineering
- Workplaces: Chungbuk National University; Shinhan University

- Kim Ung-yong
- Hangul: 김웅용
- Hanja: 金雄鎔
- RR: Gim Ungyong
- MR: Kim Ungyong

Kim Ung-Yong or Kim Woong-Yong (Korean: 김웅용; born March 8, 1962) is a South Korean civil engineer and professor. He is best known for being a child prodigy with the highest recorded IQ on record, having scored above 210 on the Stanford–Binet Intelligence Scale. He entered university at age 4 and at age 7, he received an invitation to work at NASA. By age 5, he spoke five languages.

== Early life ==
Kim Ung-Yong was born on March 8, 1962, in Seoul, South Korea. His father, Kim Soo-Sun, was a physics professor at Konkuk University and his mother, Yoo Myung-Hyun, was a teacher. According to Yoo, by the time he was 1, her son learned both the Korean alphabet and 1,000 Chinese characters by studying the Thousand Character Classic, a sixth-century Chinese poem.

At 3, he could, allegedly, solve calculus problems and published a 247-page bestselling collection of his essays in English and German, as well as his calligraphy and illustrations.

=== Fuji TV appearance ===
At age 5, Kim appeared on Fuji Television in Japan and shocked the audience by solving differential equations. Later he appeared on Japanese TV again to solve complicated differential and integral calculus problems; he later recalled the experience:

I was really lonely. No one ever made friends with me. After work hours, I could exercise and enjoy my hobbies but no one could accompany me. I came from another country and I was young, so there were no seats for children though everyone was an adult.

== Education ==
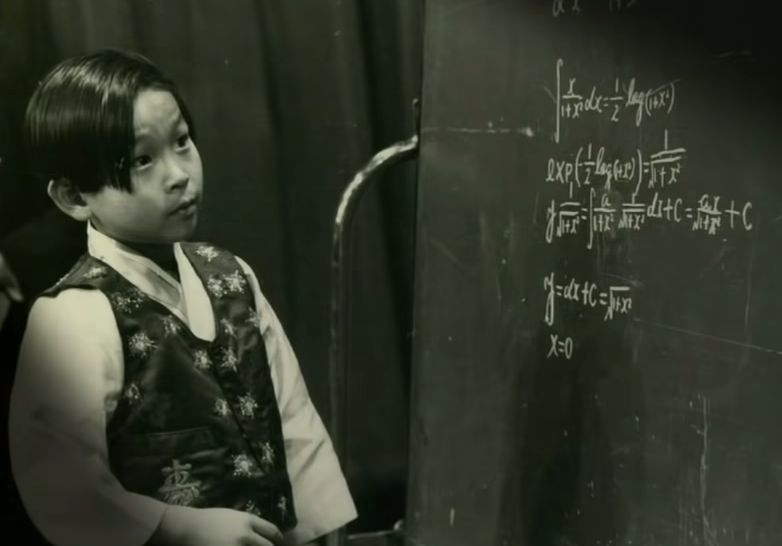
Kim solving differential equations at the age of 7

Kim allegedly went to study nuclear physics at the University of Colorado when he was 8, according to popular sources. However, at the time of his college entrance exam's fitness section, where he gained much media attention, his father told reporters that going to Japan to shoot the Fuji TV show was the "one and only time he went out of the country" and that reports of his Ph.D and master's degree progress in the U.S. were "journalistic nonsense". His statement that his son never left is slightly detracted by the statement of Kim's mother, who said that while he did "leave for a short moment to audit classes at the University of Colorado", he returned immediately due to their facilities being "inadequate for [Kim]'s genius," who was homeschooled until his college entrance exam.

After returning to South Korea, Kim was required to formally complete schooling to get a job. He later enrolled in Chungbuk National University where he studied civil engineering and earned a Ph.D.

=== Adulthood ===
As of 2007, he served as adjunct faculty at Chungbuk National University. On March 14, 2014, he became an associate professor at Shinhan University and vice president of the North Kyeong-gi Development Research Center.

In 2012, Kim denied the idea of being a "failed genius." "I'm trying to tell people that I'm happy the way I am. But why do people have to call my happiness a failure?" He added, "Some think that high IQ people can be omnipotent, but that's not true. Look at me, I don't have musical talent nor do I excel at sports. [...] Society shouldn't judge anyone with unilateral standards – everyone has different learning levels, hopes, talents and dreams and we should respect that".

== See also ==
- K. Visalini, an Indian prodigy who is purported to have a tested 225 IQ
