= April 1962 =

Month of 1962

<<	April 1962					>>
Su	Mo	Tu	We	Th	Fr	Sa
1	2	3	4	5	6	7
8	9	10	11	12	13	14
15	16	17	18	19	20	21
22	23	24	25	26	27	28
29	30

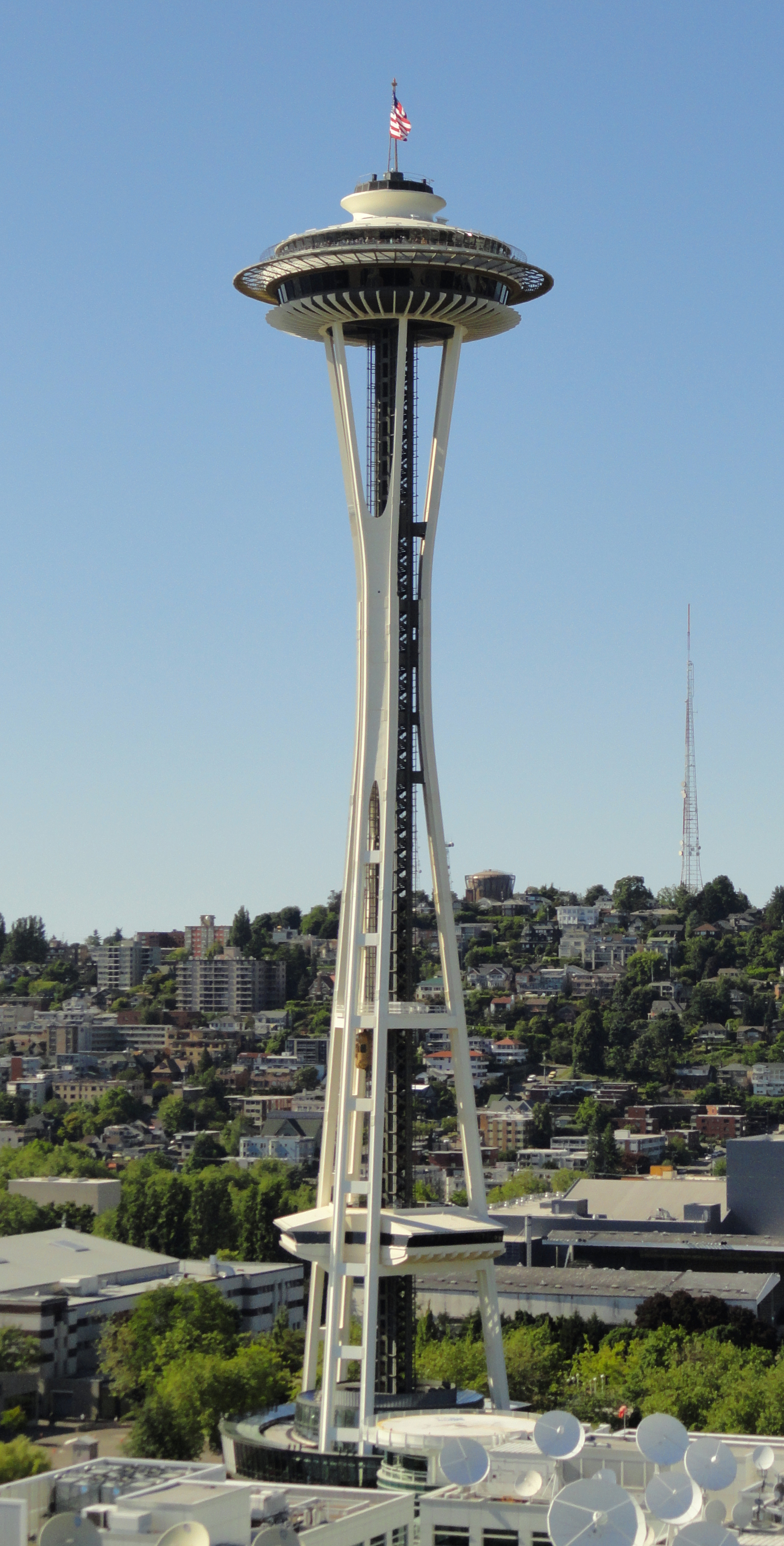
April 21, 1962: Seattle World's Fair opens

The following events occurred in April 1962:

== April 1, 1962 (Sunday) ==
- The New Zealand Broadcasting Corporation was established.
- Born: Phillip Schofield, English broadcaster; in Oldham
- Died: Michel de Ghelderode, 63, Belgian playwright

== April 2, 1962 (Monday) ==
- The 3rd Lok Sabha began its five-year session in the Parliament of India, with 494 legislators. It would last until March 3, 1967. Jawaharlal Nehru became Prime Minister of India for the fourth time, though with a reduced majority.
- Born: Clark Gregg, American actor, director and screenwriter; in Boston

== April 3, 1962 (Tuesday) ==
- Hawaii's Governor, William F. Quinn, declared a "state of food emergency" after a strike of American shipworkers entered its third week. Since March 16, longshoremen had refused to unload food from eight ships in Honolulu harbor. Governor Quinn estimated that Hawaii had only two weeks' supply of staple foods left. Two weeks later, a federal judge in California would invoke the Taft–Hartley Act to halt the strike temporarily.
- As the Algerian War for Independence came to an end, European OAS gunmen near Algiers carried out a terrorist attack against a Muslim hospital in the suburb of Beau-Fraisier, killing nine. The 15 former French Army soldiers, armed with sub-machine guns, rushed past hospital employees and targeted bedridden patients, then exited. Most of the victims had been hospitalized for months, due to ailments unrelated to the war.
- U.S. District Judge J. Skelly Wright ordered the desegregation of elementary schools in New Orleans, with African-American and White students to attend first through sixth grade together. Wright's order came one week after Roman Catholic private schools in New Orleans were ordered integrated by Archbishop Joseph Rummel.
- Representatives of Manned Spacecraft Center, Ames Research Center, Martin, and McDonnell began the Project Gemini wind tunnel testing to investigate the effect of hatches on launch stability; the effect of large angles of attach, Reynolds number, and retrorocket jet effects on booster tumbling; (3) exit characteristics of the spacecraft; and (4) characteristics of the reentry module.
- Born: Jaya Prada (stage name for Lalitha Rani), Indian film actress and member of parliament; in Rajahmundry, Andhra Pradesh state

== April 4, 1962 (Wednesday) ==
- John Kenneth Galbraith, at the time the U.S. Ambassador to India, wrote a letter to President Kennedy proposing a negotiated peace between North Vietnam and South Vietnam, before the American presence escalated further. Kennedy felt the plan was feasible and instructed Assistant U.S. Secretary of State Averell Harriman to reply favorably to Galbraith's idea. Years later, researcher Gareth Porter would locate Harriman's alteration of the telegram to Galbraith, replacing the President's approval of mutual de-escalation talks with instructions to threaten further escalation if North Vietnam did not withdraw.
- The Manned Spacecraft Center (MSC) awarded a contract to B.F. Goodrich Company for $209,701 to develop and make prototype pressure suits for Project Gemini. Related contracts went to Federal-Mogul Corporation and Protection, Inc. Goodrich was required to produce four successively improved prototypes of an advanced full-pressure suit, and two prototypes of a partial-wear, quick-assembly, full-pressure suit.
- Died: James Hanratty, 25, English criminal, hanged in Bedford Gaol for the 1961 A6 murder. Afterward, witnesses claimed that they had seen him in another town at the time. In 1997, a police committee would conclude that he had been wrongfully convicted, but the decision was reversed by the Criminal Cases Review Commission and upheld by a court of appeal in 2002.

== April 5, 1962 (Thursday) ==
- A federal grand jury indicted Billie Sol Estes, a major supporter of then U.S. Vice-President Lyndon B. Johnson, along with three of Estes's assistants, for charges of conspiracy to plot a $24,000,000 fraud of investors.
- U.S. Supreme Court Justice Felix Frankfurter suffered a stroke while in his office, and was never able to return to hearing cases. He would resign on August 28.
- Born:
  - Kirsan Ilyumzhinov, Kalmyk multimillionaire politician, former President of the FIDE, and leader of the Russian Republic of Kalmykia from 1993 to 2010; in Elista, Kalmyk ASSR, Russian SFSR
  - Sara Danius, Swedish literary critic and philosopher (d. 2019); in Täby
  - Lana Clarkson, American actress who was shot and killed by record producer Phil Spector at his mansion (d. 2003); in Long Beach, California.

== April 6, 1962 (Friday) ==
- The United Steel Workers of America and steel manufacturers agreed to a new contract, brokered by the U.S. Department of Labor, in which the union reduced its demands for a wage increase from 17 cents to 10 cents an hour, based upon the White House's determination to hold down prices. Four days later, the steel makers raised their prices anyway. A furious President Kennedy forced U.S. Steel and other companies to rescind the increase on April 13.
- American conductor Leonard Bernstein of the New York Philharmonic orchestra caused controversy with his remarks before a concert featuring pianist Glenn Gould. Bernstein stated that, although he disagreed with Gould's style of playing Brahms' Piano Concerto No. 1, he found Gould's ideas fascinating and would conduct the piece anyway. Bernstein's action received a withering review from music critic Harold C. Schonberg of The New York Times.

== April 7, 1962 (Saturday) ==
- Author Milovan Djilas, at one time a vice-president of Yugoslavia and a possible successor to President Tito, was returned to prison after violating a new Yugoslavian law that made it a crime to write about "confidential subjects that may harm Yugoslavia". Djilas had been in prison from 1957 to 1961 after criticizing communism in his book The New Class. The new charges stemmed from a January magazine article in the Italian magazine Tempo Presente, and an upcoming book, Conversations With Stalin.
- A five-man military tribunal in Cuba convicted the 1,179 surviving attackers of the Bay of Pigs Invasion of an attempt to overthrow the government a year earlier, with a sentence of 30 years' incarceration for each prisoner. The tribunal levied "fines" totaling $62 million for the release of the prisoners. The United States would negotiate release of the men by year's end with the delivery of $53,000,000 worth of medicine and food.
- At the Ealing Jazz Club in London, Brian Jones was introduced to Mick Jagger and Keith Richards. The three would become the heart of The Rolling Stones, formed later that year.
- ACF Industries, Inc., received a $1,000,000 subcontract to provide C-band and S-band radar beacons for the Gemini spacecraft tracking system. Their function was to provide tracking responses to interrogation signals from ground stations.
- Died: Jaroslav Durych, 75, Czech writer

== April 8, 1962 (Sunday) ==
- In France, the Évian Accords were ratified in a referendum, with 9 out of every 10 French voters in favor of letting French Algeria become its own independent nation. The final result was 17,866,423 in favor of Algerian independence, and 1,809,074 against.
- Born: Izzy Stradlin (stage name for Jeffrey D. Isbell), American rock guitarist for the hard rock band Guns N' Roses; in Lafayette, Indiana
- Died: Juan Belmonte, 69, Spanish bullfighter who revolutionized the sport

== April 9, 1962 (Monday) ==
- The Cleveland Pipers defeated the Kansas City Steers, 106–102, to win the first and only championship series in the American Basketball League. Cleveland had lost the first two games of the best-of-5 series, then won the next two 116–114 and 100–98, to force the final game, which took place at the small gymnasium at Kansas City's Rockhurst College because the city's arena was unavailable. The Steers would be declared the champions of the 1962–63 ABL season based on having the best record when the league disbanded on December 31, 1962.
- Arnold Palmer won a three-way playoff for his third Masters Tournament title, beating defending champion Gary Player and Dow Finsterwald. All three of the golfers had finished the first 72 holes the day before in 280 strokes, after Palmer shot 75, Finsterwald 73 and Player 71. In the playoff, Palmer's 68 was followed by Player's 71 and Finsterwald's 77.
- A two-day conference opened in Washington, D.C., between representatives of four of the largest American church organizations. The Methodist Church, the Episcopal Church, the United Presbyterian Church and the United Church of Christ discussed a possible merger of the denominations to create "United Protestantism in America".
- Police in Marseille recovered eight Paul Cézanne paintings that had been stolen on August 13 while on loan to a museum in Aix-en-Provence. The value of the works, which included The Card Players, was $2,000,000.
- The National Geographic Society awarded the Hubbard Medal to John Glenn. Glenn joined such recipients as Admiral Robert E. Peary, Charles A. Lindbergh, Roald Amundsen, and Admiral Richard E. Byrd.
- The Cosmonautics Day holiday was established in the Soviet Union, a year after the first human spaceflight. It remains a holiday (April 12) and is now designated International Day of Human Space Flight.
- The United States Marine Corps' involvement in the Vietnam War began when HMM-362 arrived at Sóc Trăng south of Saigon (South Vietnam).

== April 10, 1962 (Tuesday) ==
- U.S. Steel Chairman Roger Blough informed President Kennedy, at a 5:45 p.m. meeting at the White House, that the largest steel manufacturer in the world was planning to raise its prices by six dollars per ton at 12:01 a.m. Kennedy reportedly told Blough, "You've made a terrible mistake." As Blough's press release reached American newspapers, the President announced that he would have a special press conference on Thursday.
- Jamaica held its first parliamentary elections, in preparation for its independence from the United Kingdom. The Jamaica Labour Party won 26 of 45 parliamentary seats, making Alexander Bustamante the new Prime Minister. Losing its legislative majority was the People's National Party, led by colonial Chief Minister Norman Manley.
- The Houston Colt .45s, later renamed the Houston Astros, played their very first game, defeating the visiting Chicago Cubs, 11–2, and in Los Angeles, the first MLB game was played at Dodger Stadium, where 52,564 fans watched the home team lose, 6–3, to the Cincinnati Reds.
- Died:
  - Michael Curtiz (Kertész Kaminer Manó), 75, Hungarian-American director of multiple films, including Casablanca, for which he won an Academy Award
  - Stu Sutcliffe, 21, original bass player for The Beatles until being replaced by Paul McCartney, died from a cerebral hemorrhage

== April 11, 1962 (Wednesday) ==
- As three other American steelmakers announced a price hike, President Kennedy denounced "Big Steel" in a press conference "with the strongest language he has leveled at anyone or anything since becoming President". In March, the U.S. Department of Labor had helped mediate a contract between the United Steelworkers of America and the companies, with the union agreeing to a smaller wage increase in order to prevent a price rise.
- The New York Mets played their first game, losing to the St. Louis Cardinals, 11–4, at St. Louis.
- Died: George Poage, 81, first African-American athlete to win an Olympic medal

== April 12, 1962 (Thursday) ==
- U.S.President Kennedy demanded that American steelmakers completely roll back the price hike that they had announced earlier in the week, and the U.S. Department of Justice ordered a federal grand jury investigation for possible antitrust violations. U.S. Steel Chairman Roger Blough said in a press conference that the $6 per ton increase would not be rescinded. Meanwhile, two smaller companies, Inland Steel and Armco Steel, refused to go along with the six that did raise their prices.
- Nine miners were killed and nine injured in an accident at Tower Colliery, Hirwaun, Wales.
- Born:
  - Jarosław Kalinowski, Polish politician who briefly served as Deputy Prime Minister of Poland; in Wyszków
  - Sheila Kennedy, American model, actress and contestant on Big Brother 9; in Memphis, Tennessee.
- Died: Antoine Pevsner, 76, Belarusian Soviet sculptor

== April 13, 1962 (Friday) ==
- U.S. Secretary of Labor Arthur J. Goldberg met privately in New York City with U.S. Steel Chairman Roger M. Blough, and outlined the steps that the Kennedy administration would take if the steel price increase continued. At 3:05 p.m., Kaiser Steel rescinded its price increase, followed by Bethlehem Steel at 3:21 p.m. The largest of the companies, U.S. Steel, capitulated at 5:25 p.m., followed by Republic Steel (5:57), Pittsburgh Steel (6:26), Jones & Laughlin (6:37), National Steel (7:33) and Youngstown Sheet & Tube (9:09).
- Edmond Jouhaud, the second-in-command of the Organisation armée secrète, was sentenced to death in France.
- Martin-Baltimore and U.S. Air Force Space Systems Division (SSD) proposed abort criteria for the malfunction detection system (MDS) of the Gemini spacecraft. The MDS would display data to the astronauts, who would have the sole decision on manually initiating a mission abort.
- Born: Hillel Slovak, Israeli-American musician, best known as the founding guitarist of the Los Angeles rock band Red Hot Chili Peppers; in Haifa, Israel (d. 1988)

== April 14, 1962 (Saturday) ==
- Cuba's new revolutionary socialist prime minister Fidel Castro, "in an unexpected burst of generosity", allowed 60 of the 1,179 Bay of Pigs invaders to be released from Principe Prison for reasons of health, and to be flown from Havana to Miami on a Pan American World Airways jet, without conditions.
- Elgin Baylor scored a playoff record 61 points for the Los Angeles Lakers, who won Game 5 of the NBA finals, 128–121, against the Celtics at the Boston Garden. The record would stand for 24 years, until broken by Michael Jordan on April 20, 1986, also against the Celtics at Boston Garden.
- Michel Debre resigned the office of Prime Minister of France after more than three years, bringing to a close "the longest French parliamentary government since the 18th century" and was replaced by Georges Pompidou, who would succeed Charles de Gaulle as President of France.
- Died: Sir Mokshagundam Visvesvaraya, 100, Indian engineer and statesman

== April 15, 1962 (Sunday) ==
- Scott Carpenter and Walter Schirra, designated as pilot and backup pilot, respectively, for the Mercury 7 mission, began training for boarding a life raft and the use of survival packs.
- The Society of Toxicology assembled for its first meeting, conducted in Atlantic City, New Jersey.
- Born: Nawal El Moutawakel, Moroccan athlete; in Casablanca
- Died:
  - Clara Blandick, 85, American stage and film actress best known for portraying "Aunt Em" in the 1939 film The Wizard of Oz, committed suicide in her Hollywood apartment after suffering for years from arthritis and facing the loss of her eyesight.
  - Arsenio Lacson, 50, 17th Mayor of Manila since 1952; after suffering a stroke at a hotel suite while preparing to leave to make his weekly radio and television broadcast.

== April 16, 1962 (Monday) ==
- Walter Cronkite, a former United Press reporter best known for hosting the CBS program You Are There, replaced Douglas Edwards as the anchorman for the CBS Evening News, at that time a 15-minute program that ran from 6:45 to 7:00 p.m. Eastern Time. Cronkite, who would be nicknamed "The Most Trusted Man in America", would anchor the news until his retirement in 1981, when he would be replaced by Dan Rather.
- Byron White was sworn in as a new Associate Justice of the United States Supreme Court, five days after being confirmed by the Senate on a voice vote. The first Justice to have been a former clerk, and the only former NFL player to ever serve on the High Court, White served until 1993, when he would be replaced by Ruth Bader Ginsburg.
- Folk singer Bob Dylan, who had recently released his debut album, made the first public performance of what would become his signature song, "Blowin' in the Wind". The setting was Gerde's Folk City, a "jazz club" located at 11 West 4th Street in New York City's Greenwich Village.
- The Spy Who Loved Me, Ian Fleming's tenth James Bond novel, was first published by Jonathan Cape.
- Born: Martin Zaimov, Bulgarian financier and politician; in Geneva, Switzerland

== April 17, 1962 (Tuesday) ==
- After concluding that the sealing of East Germany's borders had been successful, the Politburo for the DDR's Germany's Communist Party, the SED, approved a new policy instructing police to make fewer arrests and for the courts to apply lesser penalties for violations of the law. In June, 6,000 prisoners would be released from prison.
- The Strategic Hamlet Program was started by United States funding in South Vietnam, with the forcible move of residents of small villages to new locations that could be protected from Viet Cong infiltration. Within the first year, nearly eight million people were settled in more than 6,000 such hamlets.
- In a by-election for the UK parliamentary constituency of Derby North, caused by the death of sitting MP Clifford Wilcock, Niall MacDermot retained the seat for the Labour Party.

== April 18, 1962 (Wednesday) ==
- What was described as a fireball (a brighter than usual meteoroid) exploded 10 miles (16 km) south of the town of Eureka, Utah, at 8:15 p.m. local time. The burst of light was visible across the western United States, as far east as Gridley, Kansas. Although subsequent retellings of the story have referred to the sighting as an unidentified flying object that "landed near a power plant" in Eureka, stayed for 40 minutes, and blacked out the entire town until its departure, contemporary reports indicated that only the town's street lights were off momentarily because the photo-sensors reacted to the daylight-like brightness. Other authors' books have described the object as being seen in Oneida, New York, minutes before reaching Utah, while reports at the time noted that NORAD received one report "from as far away as New York", though all other sightings were from eleven western states.
- The first underground ballistic missile base in the U.S. became operational, with the delivery of the first nine Titan I missiles, to silos at Lowry Air Force Base, in Colorado. By September 28, all 54 Titans would be activated at bases in five western U.S. states. However, all of the Titan I group would be removed by April 1, 1965 when they were made obsolete by the more efficient Atlas ICBM rockets, which did not have to be raised from the silo in order to be fueled and armed.
- The Boston Celtics won their 4th consecutive NBA Championship in the 7th game of the best-of-seven series, in overtime. The Celtics and the Los Angeles Lakers, tied 3–3 in the series, were tied 100–100 at the end of regulation. L.A.'s Frank Selvy had tied the game, then missed a jump shot that would have won in regulation.
- The Commonwealth Immigrants Act in the United Kingdom received royal assent, removing free immigration from the citizens of member states of the Commonwealth of Nations, requiring proof of employment in the UK. The law would go into effect on July 1.
- NASA began accepting applications for its second group of astronauts, with a goal of getting at least 5, and no more than 10, astronauts to augment the seven-member Mercury astronaut team. An applicant had to (1) be an experienced jet test pilot, preferably working currently with high-performance aircraft; (2) have attained experimental flight test status through experience or as a graduate from a military test pilot school; (3) have earned a degree in the physical or biological sciences or in engineering; (4) be a U.S. citizen less than 35 years old and no taller than 6 feet (1.8 m); and (5) be recommended by his employer. Applications were accepted until June 1. Qualifying candidates would be interviewed in July 1962 and be given written examinations on their engineering and scientific knowledge, then thoroughly examined by a group of medical specialists. Training would include work with engineers, simulator flying, centrifuge training and flights in high-performance aircraft.
- Born: Jeff Dunham, American ventriloquist, stand-up comedian and actor; in Dallas
- Died: Harry A. Franck, 80, American travel writer

== April 19, 1962 (Thursday) ==
- Communist China's Prime Minister Zhou Enlai arrived in Delhi to begin six days of meetings with India's Prime Minister Jawaharlal Nehru to negotiate an end to a boundary dispute between the world's two largest nations. No resolution was reached, and the two would go to war six months later.
- McDonnell awarded a $26,600,000 subcontract to IBM to provide the digital computer system for the Gemini spacecraft guidance and control system, as well as an incremental velocity indicator, the manual data insertion unit, and the auxiliary computer power unit.
- NASA announced that John Glenn's Mercury 6 capsule, Friendship 7, would be lent to the United States Information Agency for a world tour with 20 stops on all continents. This worldwide tour was known as the "fourth orbit" of Friendship 7, which had made three orbits of the Earth on February 20.
- Born: Al Unser Jr., American race car driver who won the Indianapolis 500 in 1992 and 1994; in Albuquerque, New Mexico

== April 20, 1962 (Friday) ==
- OAS leader Raoul Salan was arrested in Algiers, after a tip from a drug dealer led French Army security forces to his hideout on the fifth floor of a luxury apartment building in Algiers. Salan had dyed his gray hair black and grown a mustache. General Salan had once been commander of the French Army in Algeria, before leading a revolt against the plan to separate French Algeria as a state independent of France.
- The National Socialist Movement (NSM) was founded by right-wing Britons Colin Jordan and John Tyndall, as a Neo-Nazi political party and a revival of Oswald Mosley's pre-World War II British Union of Fascists.
- Died: Grover Whalen, 75, New York City public events co-ordinator credited with inventing the ticker-tape parade

== April 21, 1962 (Saturday) ==
- The Century 21 Exposition World's Fair opened in Seattle, at 11:00 a.m. local time. A group of 1,000 newsmen had previewed the fair the day before. In addition to the 606-foot (185 m) tall Space Needle building, which became a symbol of Seattle, the Fair included a carnival that would "fit a working man's budget". The carnival, in operation for the duration of the fair, was called "Gayway". The fair would run until October 21, hosting 9,609,969 guests over six months.
- A flight formation of 24 U.S. Air Force and U.S. Navy jets, part of the opening ceremonies of the Seattle World's Fair, ended in tragedy. One of the F-102 Dagger jet fighters experienced flight trouble. The pilot ejected safely, but the jet crashed into a residential neighborhood at the suburb of Mountlake Terrace, Washington, destroying two homes and killing an elderly couple. A five-member family, that normally resided in the other home, had gone on Easter vacation to avoid the traffic associated with the fair opening.
- Carlos Ortíz defeated Joe Brown to win the world lightweight boxing championship. Ortíz had formerly been in a heavier class as the world junior welterweight champion. Brown had been the lightweight champion for more than five years.
- Died: Frederick Handley Page, 76, founder of Britain's first aircraft manufacturing company, Handley Page, Ltd.

== April 22, 1962 (Sunday) ==
- Soviet citizens who had been living in China's Xinjiang Province began crossing the Chinese-Soviet border to escape famine and persecution. Over the next six weeks, 67,000 people fled from Xinjiang into the Kazakh SSR, without interference from either side.
- The Toronto Maple Leafs defeated the Chicago Blackhawks, 2–1, to win ice hockey's Stanley Cup in the sixth game of a best-of-seven series.
- Born: Han Aiping, Chinese badminton player and 1985 and 1987 women's world champion (d. 2019); in Wuhan
- Died: Vera Reynolds, 62, American film actress

== April 23, 1962 (Monday) ==
- The American Ranger 4 satellite was launched at 2:50 p.m. local time from Cape Canaveral, with the objective of gathering data from the Moon. A few hours later, ground control found that the satellite would be unable to keep still enough to provide useful information. One NASA official commented, "All we've got is an idiot with a radio signal."
- After starting with nine consecutive losses in their first season, baseball's New York Mets finally won a game, defeating the Pittsburgh Pirates, who had started 1962 with ten consecutive wins. The Mets would finish the 1962 season with a record of 40 wins and 120 losses, 60 1/2 games out of first place.
- At a motor racing meeting at Goodwood Circuit, UK, Graham Hill won the 1962 Glover Trophy and Bruce McLaren won the 1962 Lavant Cup. During the Glover Trophy race, Stirling Moss suffered serious injuries in an accident, which effectively ended his career as a top-level racing driver.
- Born: John Hannah, Scottish actor; in East Kilbride

== April 24, 1962 (Tuesday) ==
- In a joint session of the Supreme Soviet in Moscow, Nikita Khrushchev was re-elected as Premier of the Soviet Union, and Leonid Brezhnev was re-elected as President of the Presidium. Khrushchev would be replaced on October 14, 1964, as both the Premier (by Alexei Kosygin) and Communist Party First Secretary, by Brezhnev.
- The Soviet Kosmos 4 satellite, the first designed to cover the entire land area of the United States from orbit, was launched from Baikonur Cosmodrome at 1002 UTC. It would circuit the Earth for three days before returning with its data.
- Died:
  - Prince Sahle Selassie, 31, youngest child of Emperor Haile Selassie of Ethiopia
  - Emilio Prados, 63, Spanish poet

== April 25, 1962 (Wednesday) ==
- "We have created the first synthetic thunderstorm in space", NASA scientist Dr. Wernher von Braun announced, after an American Saturn rocket released 95 tonnes (93 long tons; 105 short tons) of water into the ionosphere. At an altitude of 65 miles (105 km), explosives on the rocket were detonated by ground control, creating a 25-mile (40 km) wide cloud of ice that was visible from Florida. Von Braun announced that electrical charges were detected in the ice mass.
- In Moscow, Soviet Premier Nikita Khrushchev informed the USSR's legislature, the Supreme Soviet, that the nation would need to replace the constitution that had been in place since 1936.
- The United States ended its moratorium on atmospheric testing of nuclear weapons at 10:45 p.m. local time near Christmas Island.
- Studebaker Corporation received a subcontract for $457,875 to provide two backup heatshields for the Gemini spacecraft. Test results from screening advanced heatshield materials had yielded four promising materials.

== April 26, 1962 (Thursday) ==
- The first British satellite, Ariel 1, was launched at 1800 UTC from the Wallops Flight Facility in the United States, and would remain in Earth orbit until April 24, 1976. The United Kingdom-United States collaboration made the launch the first multinational space effort in history.
- Ranger 4 landed on the Moon, marking the first time the U.S. had landed an object on an astronomical object. The mission was not fully successful, in that A malfunction in the guidance system prevented Ranger 4 from sending back usable photographs or other data. Tumbling out of control, the satellite crashed (as planned) into the far side of the Moon at 7:49 a.m. Eastern Time (1249 UTC), after a 64-hour journey from Earth. Impacting at nearly 6,000 miles per hour (9,700 km/h), Ranger 4 was destroyed, but proved that the U.S. could land on the Moon. Ranger 4, in the process, became the first object launched from Earth to impact the far side of the Moon.
- Lou Schalk piloted the first flight of the A-12 Blackbird, prototype for the Lockheed SR-71 Blackbird jet airplane, taking off and landed at the Groom Lake base in Nevada.
- At a stockholders' meeting at the Studebaker-Packard Corporation, the Packard name was dropped entirely, bringing an end to the automobile brand that had existed since 1902. The company had assumed the name after Packard Motor Car Company had merged with Studebaker Corporation in 1954.
- Representatives of North American Aviation, NASA Headquarters, Langley Research Center, Flight Research Center, Ames Research Center, and Manned Spacecraft Center met to review the Paraglider Development Program. At the end of the review, the board recommended 21 changes in design and test procedures to North American.
- The Cleveland Indians traded catcher Harry Chiti to the New York Mets "for a player to be named later". On June 15, the Mets would name Chiti as the player to be sent to the Indians' farm system, making him the first Major League Baseball player to be "traded for himself".
- At an Atlas-Agena coordination meeting, Lockheed presented a comprehensive description of its proposed propulsion development plans for the Agena target vehicle.
- Died: Jerry Skinner, 62, New Zealand war hero and Deputy Prime Minister of New Zealand from 1957 to 1960

== April 27, 1962 (Friday) ==
- In Los Angeles, a confrontation outside a mosque between two LAPD officers, and two members of the Nation of Islam, led to a shootout that killed one of the men. When a group of Black Muslims came out of the building, the situation escalated involving 75 police. When the confrontation was over, mosque secretary Ronald Stokes was dead, and six other Muslims and seven policemen were injured. The two policemen claimed self-defense in the face of an attack while the Muslims said that their secretary, Ronald Stokes, had been beaten and shot at close range, after which the officers fired into an unarmed crowd. The incident, which heightened racial tensions in L.A., first brought Malcolm X to national attention, and led to a split between him and NOI leader Elijah Muhammad.
- Wake Forest University was made fully integrated, after trustees voted 17–9 to allow qualified undergraduates to be admitted regardless of race. A year earlier, the North Carolina college had dropped racial bars to admission to Wake's post-graduate schools, and for nighttime classes.
- Gheorghe Gheorghiu-Dej, the General Secretary of Romania's Communist Party, announced that the implementation of collective farming nationwide had been successful, with the government fully controlling all agricultural production.
- The USAF Special Air Warfare Center was activated at Eglin Air Force Base near Valparaiso, Florida.
- Died: A. K. Fazlul Huq, 88, Bengali statesman who had served as Governor of East Pakistan (now the nation of Bangladesh) from 1956 to 1958, and Chief Minister of the Bengal state in British India (1937–43)

== April 28, 1962 (Saturday) ==
- Following the U.S. Supreme Court decision in Baker v. Carr, a federal court in Atlanta ruled that Georgia's county-unit system was unconstitutional. Since 1868, voting in primary elections was done in a system similar to that of the American electoral college, with each of Georgia's 159 counties having at least two "unit votes", and a provision that whichever candidate finished first in a county would receive that county's units. Eight counties had six units, and 30 had four units, so voters in rural and low populated counties had a greater share of representation in a statewide election.
- Ipswich Town F.C. finished in first place in the English League, winning the league championship with a record of 24 wins, 8 draws and 10 losses. The team was in its first season in the soccer football league's First Division, having been promoted from Second Division play after its 1960–61 finish. It was the first time since 1889 that the major league championship was captured by a first year team. Dundee F.C. won its first Scottish League title on the same day, with a record of 25–4–5.
- Oskar Schindler, the German industrialist and Nazi Party member who had saved more than 1,200 Polish Jews from extermination by the Nezi government, was honored on his 54th birthday at the Yad Vashem Memorial in Jerusalem, and proclaimed as a ger toshav ("a righteous Gentile").
- Norway's parliament, the Storting, voted 113–37 in favor of Norway applying to join the European Economic Community. France would veto the application later in the year, but Norway would join the Common Market in 1972.
- Died: Gianna Beretta Molla, 39, Italian pediatrician and mother who would be canonized as a Roman Catholic Saint in 2004, died from septic peritonitis one week after having her fourth child delivered by caesarian section.

== April 29, 1962 (Sunday) ==
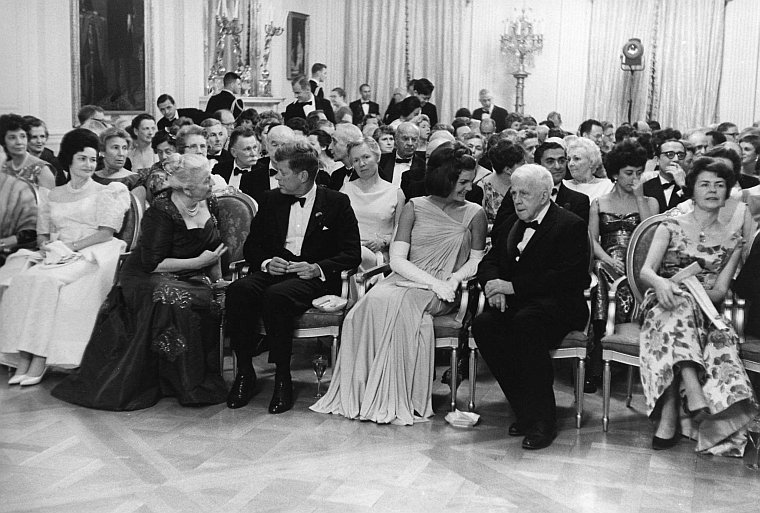
April 29, 1962: White House state dinner

- In one of the largest White House state dinners in modern times, the President and Mrs. Kennedy hosted 173 scientists, educators and writers, including 49 Nobel Prize laureates from the Western Hemisphere. President Kennedy made the famous remark, "I think this is the most extraordinary collection of talent, of human knowledge ever gathered at the White House, with the possible exception of when Thomas Jefferson dined alone." Dr. Linus Pauling, winner of the 1954 prize in chemistry, picketed outside of the White House in an anti-nuclear demonstration earlier in the day, then went inside to join the President for dinner. On greeting Dr. Pauling, Kennedy said, "I'm glad you decided to come inside."
- Dick Thompson won the President's Cup Race at Virginia International Raceway.

== April 30, 1962 (Monday) ==
- The pamphlet "Burmese Way to Socialism" (Myanma Hsoshelit Lanzin) was published and distributed throughout Burma, explaining the political philosophies of General Ne Win, who had overthrown the government on March 2. Ne Win's Revolutionary Council would form the Burma Socialist Programme Party on July 4 to implement his vision for transforming the nation by establishing "a socialist economy based on justice", and would be national dogma until he left office in 1988.
- NASA test pilot Joseph A. Walker set a new altitude record for a fixed wing aircraft, flying an X-15 jet up to 246,700 feet (75,190 meters). Afterwards, Walker told reporters "there is no question that we can put a winged vehicle in orbit and land it." On August 22, 1963, Walker would pass the 100-kilometre (62 mi) mark to reach outer space, though not orbit, in an airplane, attaining 107.955 kilometres (67.080 mi) altitude.
- An array of 27 items of bite-size food were sampled and tested for possible inclusion in the Project Mercury space flights. Swimmer training was started for the Mercury 7 mission recovery area. Instruction was given in deploying the auxiliary flotation collar and jumps from a helicopter for the May mission.
- Died: Lester Volk, 77, child prodigy musician, physician, lawyer, journalist, and U.S. Congressman (R-N.Y.) from 1920 to 1923
