= EXIN =

EXIN Holding B.V.
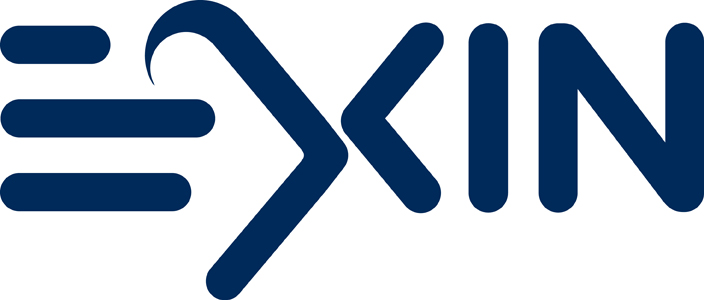
- Company type: Private
- Industry: Education
- Founded: 1984 (Amsterdam)
- Headquarters: Utrecht, NL
- Area served: Worldwide
- Products: Exams and Certifications, Professional Assessments based on the e-Competence Framework
- Brands: Astride by EXIN
- Website: www.exin.com

EXIN is a Dutch company which certifies IT professionals worldwide. In addition, EXIN accredits (training and examination) organizations in the field of ICT training and the development of ICT training materials. EXIN is active in more than 165 countries and provides examination in many languages. Since EXIN Was founded in 1984, it has assessed and certified more than two million professionals. EXIN’s headquarters are situated in Utrecht, The Netherlands.

== History ==
EXIN was founded in 1984 on the initiative of the Ministry of Economic Affairs, with the task of thoroughly and independently examining the education program Automation and Mechanization of the Administrative Information Processing (AMBI).

In the 90’s, EXIN introduced several other certification programs, such as the “Praktijkdiploma Informatica” (PDI) and the “Information Service Procurement Management” (ISPL). EXIN was one of the founding partners for the development and dissemination of ITIL®: in 1993, EXIN developed the first certification scheme for ITIL® and, in 1999, it started offering PRINCE2® certifications. In 2005, EXIN opened its first office outside the Netherlands and switched from the AMBI program to the modular and practical I-TRACKS (since 2010 called TRAKCS). From 2010, EXIN started developing certification programs with reference to the e-Competence Framework (e-CF). IN 2017, EXIN collaborated with BCS, APMG, iFDC and VanHaren Publishing to launch a new IT Service Management framework: VeriSM.

EXIN examines both through partners and examination centers, as well as through the digital service EXIN Anywhere. Using Marking-on-the-Spot technology (for iOS and Android), EXIN is able to examine exams remotely.

In 2014, EXIN launched the new service e-Competence Solutions. Besides offering Self-Scans, EXIN also offers Self-Assessments, Soft Skills Assessments and Professional Assessments to Professionals, HR-experts, organizations and candidates. All these assessments are based on the e-Competence Framework.

In 2021, EXIN was acquired by technology company Software Improvement Group, an Amsterdam-based tech company and independent global authority on software assurance.

In October 2022, EXIN developed and launched Astride, a free competency assessment tool based on the e-CF (European e-Competence Framework). This tool has assessed the digital competencies and experience of more than 4,000 professionals in 160+ countries in less than six months after its launch.

== EXIN Certifications ==
=== EXIN Dynamic Project Management Method (DPMM) – Project Manager (DPMMPM) ===
The DPMM certification offers a modern, scalable project management method integrating Agile and traditional approaches. The Project Manager level (DPMMPM) targets professionals who manage projects using practical, adaptable processes. It builds on foundational knowledge and emphasizes real-world application across project steering, planning, operations, team management, agility, risk, and quality management. This certification includes a 2-day seminar and an online exam with lifelong validity and no recertification required.

=== EXIN SIAM™ Professional ===
The SIAM Professional certification focuses on managing multiple service providers in a unified IT service ecosystem. Candidates develop skills in governance, organizational assessment, SIAM model design, implementation leadership, and continuous improvement across the SIAM roadmap stages. It is ideal for service managers, providers, consultants, and managers involved in multi-provider IT environments. The certification requires completing accredited EXIN training and passing a two-part exam: practical assignments and an objective test.

=== EXIN Artificial Intelligence Compliance Professional (AICP) ===
The AICP certification is designed for professionals responsible for ensuring AI systems comply with laws and ethical guidelines including the EU AI Act, ISO/IEC 42001, and NIST AI Risk Management Framework. It provides comprehensive knowledge on trustworthy, ethical AI development and deployment and practical application of AI compliance frameworks. Target roles include AI compliance officers, risk managers, quality managers, legal managers, and AI developers. The certification requires accredited training, practical assignments, and passing a multiple-choice exam with open-book access to the AI Act.

=== EXIN Agile Scrum Master (ASM) ===
The Agile Scrum Master certification validates knowledge and skills in agile principles and Scrum methodology, focused on facilitating and coaching Scrum teams. It covers agile mindset, Scrum Master roles, agile estimating, planning, monitoring, handling complex projects, and adopting Agile practices. The 2-day instructor-led course includes assignments and exam preparation. The exam is multiple-choice, closed-book, and requires a 65% pass mark. This certification is aimed at project managers, software developers, IT professionals, and business managers working in agile environments.

Each certification from EXIN provides internationally recognized qualifications supporting professionals in emerging digital and service management fields, with flexible online exams and lifelong credential validity.
