= September 1964 =

Month of 1964

<<	September 1964					>>
Su	Mo	Tu	We	Th	Fr	Sa
		1	2	3	4	5
6	7	8	9	10	11	12
13	14	15	16	17	18	19
20	21	22	23	24	25	26
27	28	29	30

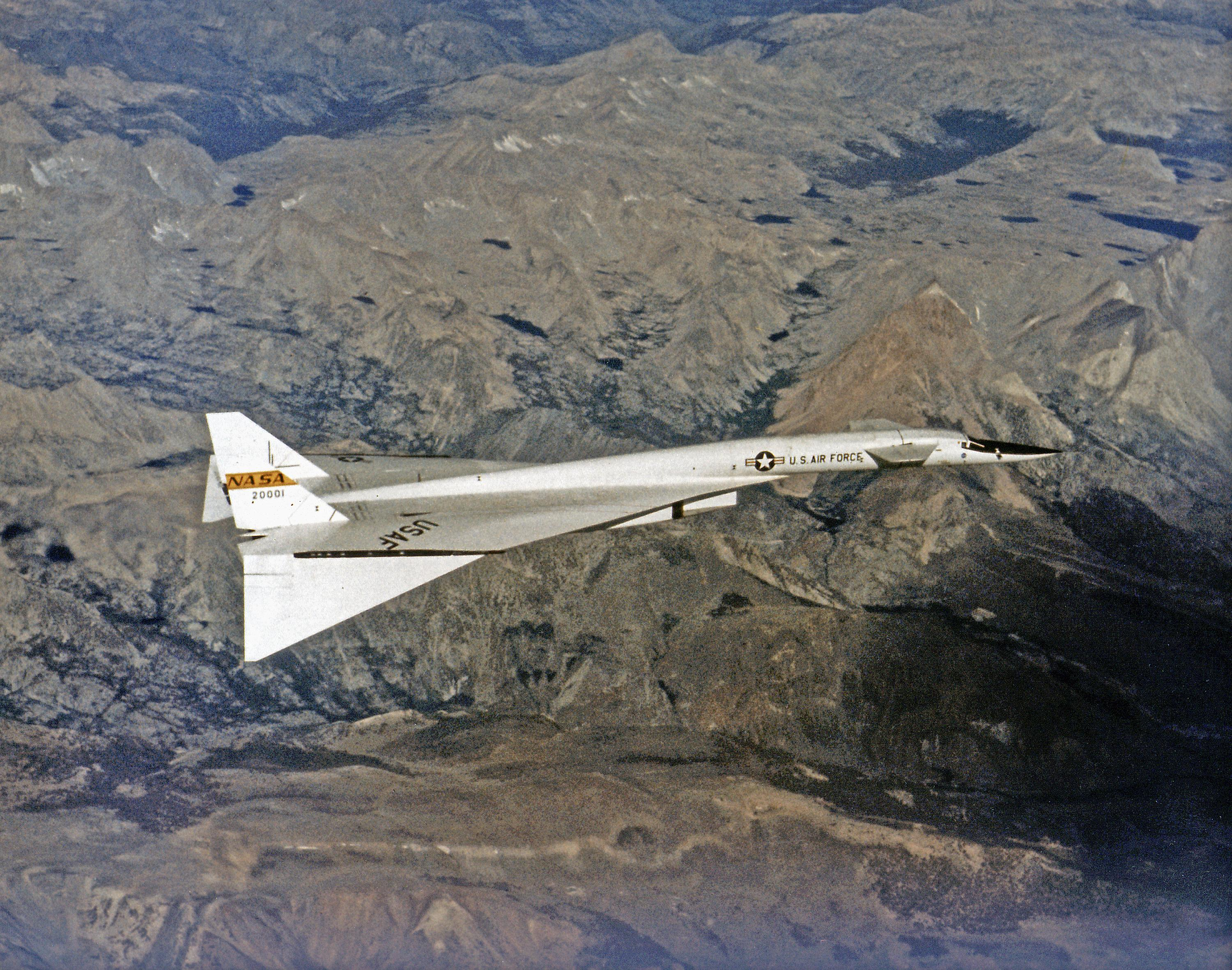
September 21, 1964: American XB-70 Valkyrie makes its first flight.

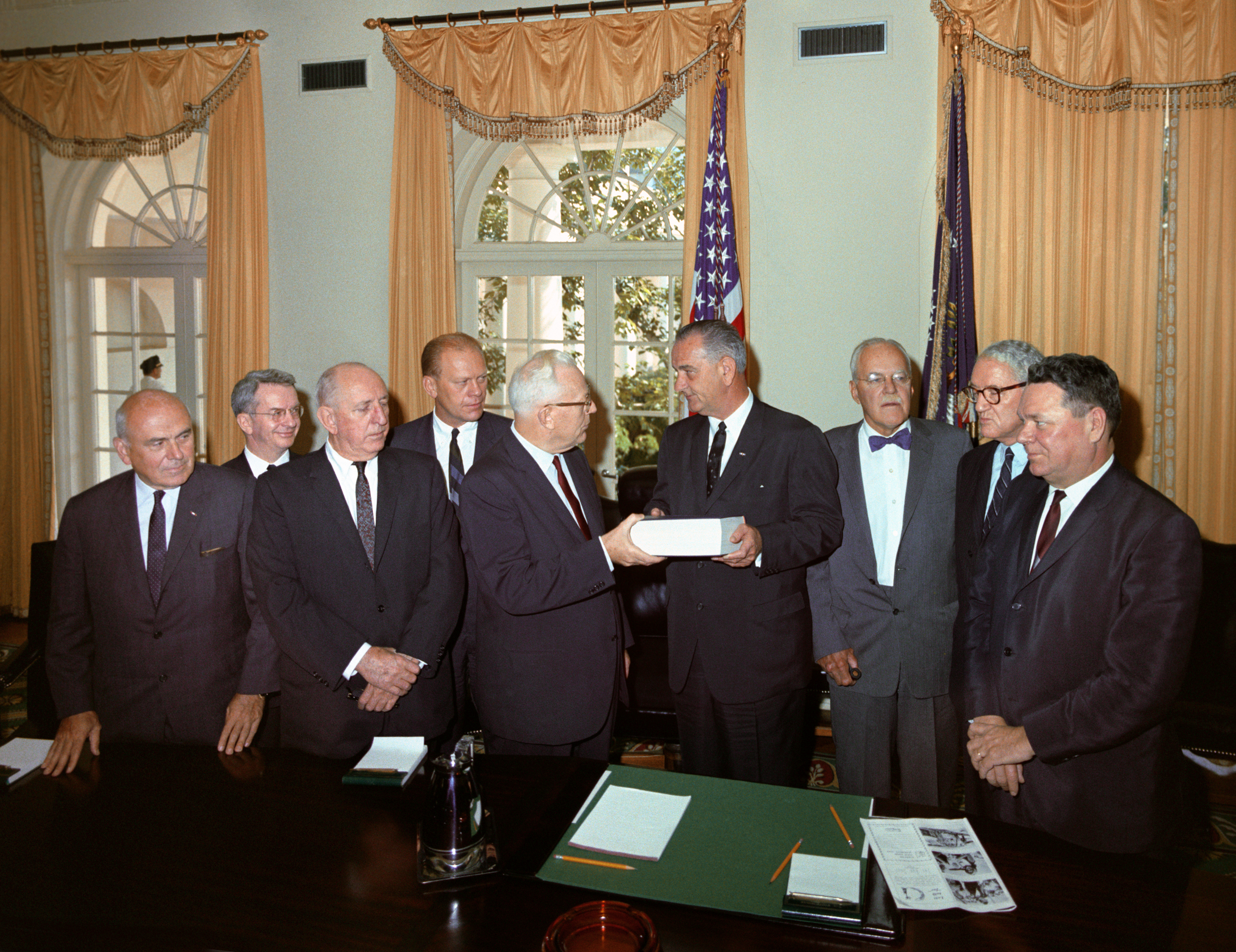
September 24, 1964: The Warren Commission delivers its report

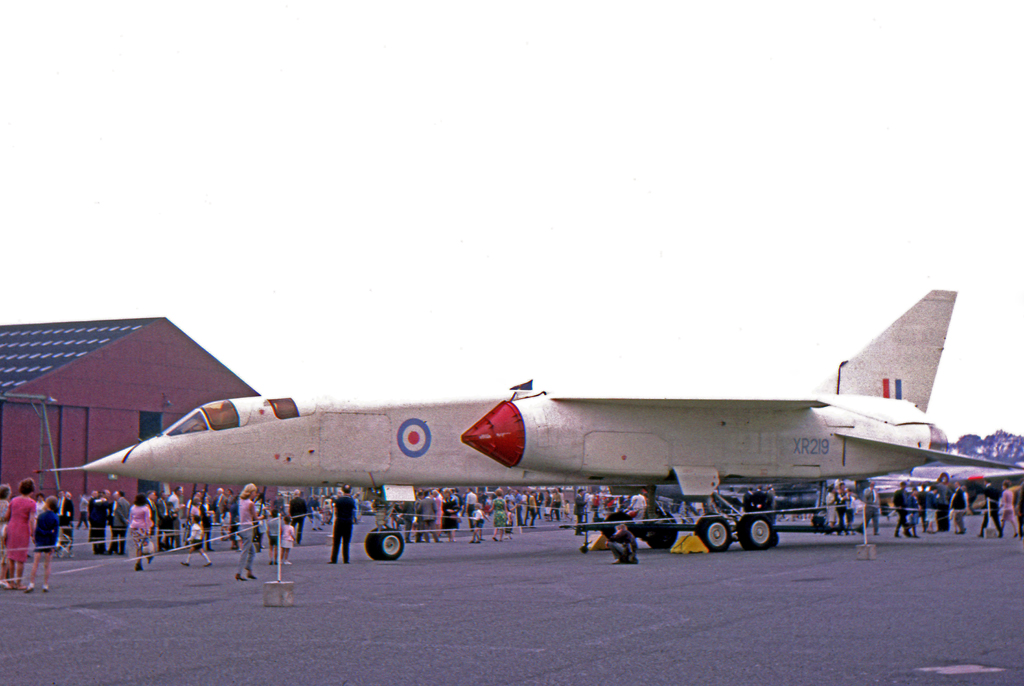
September 27, 1964: British TSR-2 makes its first flight.

September 21, 1964: Malta becomes independent

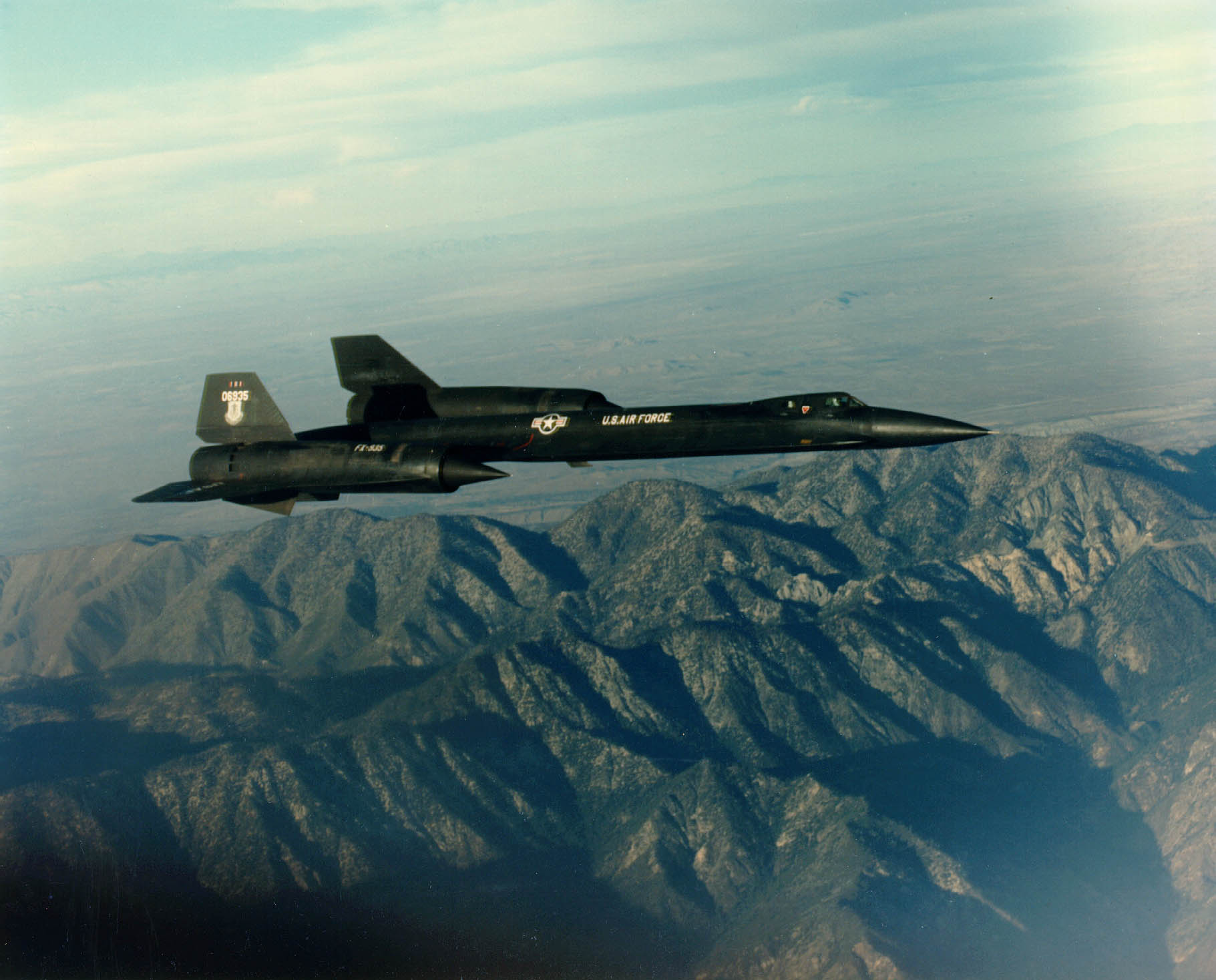
September 30, 1964: The American YF-12 makes its first flight.

The following events occurred in September 1964:

== September 1, 1964 (Tuesday) ==
- Only two months before the scheduled election to the New York State Senate, delegates to the Democratic Convention nominated U.S. Attorney General Robert F. Kennedy as their candidate for U.S. Senator, favouring him 968 to 153 over Congressman Samuel S. Stratton. On the same day, the Liberal Party of New York nominated Kennedy as its candidate as well, while the Republican Party of New York renominated the incumbent U.S. Senator, Kenneth Keating. Kennedy was a resident of Massachusetts rather than New York, but New York law did not have a residency requirement for its candidates for the U.S. Senate. Later in the day, U.S. Senator Strom Thurmond of South Carolina introduced a proposed amendment to the United States Constitution that would require that a U.S. Senator to meet the same residency requirements as a voter "in the state he represents", commenting that "Recent occurrences have negated the clear intention of the Constitution. This circumstance should be remedied."
- Masanori Murakami became the first Japanese player to appear in an American major league baseball game, coming to the mound during the 8th inning as a relief pitcher for the San Francisco Giants in their game at Shea Stadium against the New York Mets. During his brief first appearance, "Mashi" Murakami, formerly of the Nankai Hawks of Japan's Pacific League, struck out two players and allowed one single in his team's 4–1 loss to the Mets. After he proved to be a successful player during the remainder of the season, the Nankai Hawks would demand to have him back; ultimately, the Giants and the Hawks would agree that Murakami could play the full 1965 National League season and then would have to return to Japan.
- Spokoynoy nochi, malyshi! (literally, "Good night, kids!"), a ten-minute bedtime story for young children to watch before they went to bed at 9:00 p.m., premiered on Soviet Central Television. Featuring clay animation and puppetry, the series is still broadcast on Russian TV today.
- The Titan IIIA expendable launch system, on its first test launch, failed to achieve orbit.
- Died: George Georgescu, 76, Romanian conductor

== September 2, 1964 (Wednesday) ==
- Melvin D. Synhorst, a Republican as well as being the Iowa Secretary of State, set politics aside and announced that he would order November's election ballots to include the names of U.S. President Lyndon Johnson and his running mate, U.S. Senator Hubert H. Humphrey, despite the state Democratic Party's failure to file certification papers before the midnight deadline on August 31. "The placing of the names of national candidates before the voters on equal footing is of primary importance to the voters of the nation," said Synhorst, adding that "The people of Iowa and the country should not be penalized by an oversight on the part of others or for a lack of courage on my part." Johnson and Humphrey would win Iowa's nine electoral votes in November.
- At the request of President Johnson, FBI Director J. Edgar Hoover initiated a COINTELPRO (counter intelligence program) against various Ku Klux Klan organizations and other white supremacist hate groups. "The purpose of this program", Hoover wrote in a memorandum to the FBI field offices, "is to expose, disrupt and otherwise neutralize the activities of the various klans and hate organizations, their leadership and adherents."
- The murder of a Malay rickshaw driver in the Geylang Serai section of Singapore, believed to have been committed by Singaporean Chinese assailants, triggered rioting within the Malay community. Before the violence abated, 36 people would be killed and more than 500 injured.
- Having caused considerable damage and deaths in the United States, Cuba, Haiti, the Dominican Republic and Guadeloupe during late August, Hurricane Cleo, now over the Atlantic, intensified to hurricane force again, before dissipating three days later.
- Born: Keanu Reeves, Canadian film actor best known for playing Neo in The Matrix and the titular assassin in the John Wick franchise; in Beirut, Lebanon
- Died:
  - Alvin York, 76, American war hero and Medal of Honor winner whose life was commemorated in the popular film Sergeant York in 1941
  - Francisco Craveiro Lopes, 70, President of Portugal from 1951 to 1958
  - Glenn A. Black, 64, American archaeologist

== September 3, 1964 (Thursday) ==
- Because the Democratic Party was a day late on filing the necessary papers to place incumbent President Johnson and his running mate, Hubert H. Humphrey, on the ballot in South Dakota for the November general election. Secretary of State of South Dakota, Essie Wiedenman, refused to certify the candidates because the party had missed the deadline that had expired at midnight the day before. In place of the required forms, she said, she had been handed "a piece of paper" that was typed up and signed by state Democratic Party leaders to attest that Johnson and Humphrey were the party nominees. South Dakota's Attorney General (and future Governor) Frank Farrar voiced his opinion that the required paper, which was put in the mail and didn't arrive until the morning after the deadline, "arrived too late to be certified," raising the possibility that Johnson and Humphrey would not be eligible for the state's four electoral votes. However, Farrar ruled the next day that South Dakota law was ambiguous about certifying presidential candidates for the ballot, and cleared the way for President Johnson to be on the ballot in all 50 states.
- The Wilderness Act was signed into law in the United States, protecting 9,139,721 acres (14,280 square miles or 36,987 km^{2}) of federal land in 54 areas and providing a legal definition of "wilderness" as "an area where the earth and its community of life are untrammeled by man, where man himself is a visitor who does not remain", and creating the National Wilderness Preservation System. The act had passed, 374 to 1 in the U.S. House of Representatives and 73 to 12 in the U.S. Senate. Fifty years later, the protected wilderness would have added almost exactly 100 million more acres and would cover 109,138,248 acres (171,000 mi^{2} or 443,000 km^{2}) in 801 protected sites.
- Prime Minister Tunku Abdul Rahman of Malaysia proclaimed a state of emergency in a nationwide radio and television broadcast, after concluding that Indonesia was preparing to stage a massive attack on the Malaysian mainland. The day before, Indonesian paratroopers had landed in the Malaysian state of Johore.
- Prime Minister Nikita Khrushchev of the Soviet Union accepted an invitation from Chancellor Ludwig Erhard to visit West Germany, to take place in November or December after the U.S. presidential election. Khrushchev, however, would be deposed in October, before the state visit could take place.
- Two days after his nomination for U.S. Senate, Robert F. Kennedy announced his resignation as United States Attorney General.

== September 4, 1964 (Friday) ==
- Richard Sorge, a Soviet spy who had been hanged in Japan in 1944 after the Soviets had refused to exchange their own prisoners for him, received posthumous recognition from the Communist Party with the publication of an article in Pravda, celebrating the bravery and achievements of "Comrade Sorge". The campaign marked a change in state policy not to acknowledge its espionage operations to the Soviet public. Twenty years after his death, Sorge would be awarded the nation's highest honor, Hero of the Soviet Union; his likeness would appear on a postage stamp; a Moscow street would be renamed in his honor; and a tanker ship would be named for him.
- In Chile, Eduardo Frei Montalva defeated Marxist candidate Salvador Allende in the presidential election. The American CIA "became involved in extensive covert actions to ensure Allende would not win," an author would note later, contributing almost four million dollars to Frei's campaign to finance direct mail, radio advertisements, posters, leaflets and counterpropaganda. Frei received 1,409,012 votes, Allende had 977,902 and a third candidate, Julio Duran, had 125,233. Allende would defeat Frei in the 1970 presidential election, and would die in 1973 during a violent coup d'état.
- The shortest session in the history of the United States Senate — two seconds — took place in Washington after the president pro tempore, Senator Lee Metcalf of Montana, had called the Senate to order. He quickly said, "Under the previous order the Senate stands adjourned until Tuesday noon next," and struck the gavel.
- All 39 people aboard VASP Flight 141 were killed when the airliner crashed into the side of the Pico de Caledonia, a mountain in Brazil, while on its way from Recife to São Paulo. The plane had departed from Vitória and was off course when it collided into the slope at an elevation of about 6,400 feet (2,000 m).
- An all-white jury in Danielsville, Georgia, acquitted two members of the Ku Klux Klan on murder charges arising from the July 11 killing of African-American educator Lemuel Penn. Joseph Howard Sims and Cecil William Myers remained under indictment on federal civil rights violations.
- At 8:23 in the evening, the United States successfully launched the 1,000-pound (450 kg) Orbiting Geophysical Observatory (OGO 1), its largest scientific satellite up to that time, from Cape Kennedy. OGO 1 would still be in orbit around the Earth 50 years after its launch.
- The U.S. Air Force Space Systems Division (SSD) recommended the launch, as scheduled, of the GLV 2 Gemini rocket. Manned Spacecraft Center proposed cancellation because of an August 17 lightning strike and from Hurricane Cleo. After review, NASA agreed to the launch.
- The Forth Road Bridge, spanning 8,241 feet (2,512 m) over Scotland's Firth of Forth, opened for highway and pedestrian traffic. Connecting Fife with Edinburgh, the bridge replaced a ferry service that had existed for centuries.
- Died: James Cobern, 38, American criminal; by electrocution in Alabama for robbery, the last person in the United States to be executed for a crime other than murder

== September 5, 1964 (Saturday) ==
- At Stanleyville, rebels who had seized control of the city proclaimed the "People's Republic of the Congo", with Christophe Gbenye as its president.
- The sinking of the Panamanian cargo ship Dorar killed 27 of the 57 aboard in the harbor at Hong Kong after the ship had been battered by Typhoon Ruby.
- Sussex County Cricket Club defeated Warwickshire by 8 wickets at Lord's to win the 1964 Gillette Cup cricket competition.
- Australia defeated the U.S., the defending champion, in the second annual Federation Cup international women's tennis championship at Philadelphia.
- Died: Elizabeth Gurley Flynn, 74, American Communist leader and chair of the National Communist Party Committee of the CPUSA, died during a visit to Moscow. The Soviet government would accord to her a full state funeral.

== September 6, 1964 (Sunday) ==
- Heinz Barwich, one of the most prominent nuclear physicists in East Germany, defected to the West during the United Nations "Atoms for Peace" Conference in Geneva and was granted political asylum in the United States. Barwich's wife crossed into West Germany the same day, using forged identity papers, but two of their children were arrested while trying to cross at another checkpoint.
- A ceasefire went into effect in the state of Nagaland between India and the secession leaders of the Federal Government of Nagaland, after being brokered by the Nagaland Baptist Church Council and signed on August 10.
- After seven seasons, the lead human characters were written off the television series Lassie. In the story line, Timmy Martin (Jon Provost) and his adoptive parents Ruth (June Lockhart) and Paul (Hugh Reilly departed for Australia, but Lassie could not go with them because of quarantine laws. In 1957, Tommy Rettig (as Jeff Miller) had departed after four seasons and Provost had become the collie's new owner. The shows with Provost would be syndicated under the title Timmy and Lassie, while those with Rettig were shown as Jeff's Collie.
- In Reims, the French President Charles De Gaulle commemorates the 50th anniversary of the first battle of Marne.
- Died: Checkers, 12, American cocker spaniel referred to in the "Checkers speech" given in 1952 by U.S. Senator and vice-presidential candidate Richard M. Nixon when he was defending himself against accusations of receiving illegal contributions. As part of his speech, Nixon denied receiving anything except for a gift to the family from an admirer who had heard "that our two youngsters would like to have a dog... And our little girl— Tricia, the 6-year-old— named it Checkers. And you know, the kids, like all kids, love the dog and I just want to say this right now, that regardless of what they say about it, we're gonna keep it."

== September 7, 1964 (Monday) ==
- "The Daisy Ad", a television commercial and one of the most controversial political advertisements in the history of American presidential campaigns, was aired for the first and last time. U.S. President Johnson had formally opened his campaign for election to a full term, and the one-minute spot appeared during a break from NBC's showing of the 1951 film David and Bathsheba. The TV spot began with a little girl counting the petals on a daisy; after she had counted to nine, a voiceover gave a countdown from ten and, at zero, the picture of the girl faded and was replaced by a mushroom cloud from a nuclear blast. President Johnson's voice then closed the ad with the warning "These are the stakes. To make a world in which all of God's children can live, or to go into the dark. We must either love each other or we must die." Dean Burch, the Chairman of the Republican National Committee charged that, "The only innuendo that can be drawn is that President Johnson is a careful man and that Barry Goldwater is careless and reckless. It is libel per se. It is a violent political lie. It implies that Goldwater is toying with the American people." At the end of the week, U.S. Senator Everett Dirksen complained to the National Association of Broadcasters that the commercial "is in violation of your widely-heralded code of ethics" and that broadcasters who aired it should face sanctions. One author would later note 50 years later that "it could be argued that today's gotcha culture, using innuendo-based TV attack ads, began with this ad", while another would comment that "The year 1964 witnessed the fusion of political strategy and political advertising, and every subsequent race has relied on essentially the same model."
- Edward du Cann of the British Board of Trade announced the signing of the largest trade deal in history between the UK and the Soviet Union, as the Soviet purchasing agency Techmashimport and the British conglomerate Polyspinners, Ltd. agreed for the supply of British textile machinery to a polyester fiber plant being constructed in Krasnoyarsk in Siberia. In all, the United Kingdom agreed to advanced $67 million of credit over a 15-year period.
- The National Defense Council of East Germany began a program "unique among the Warsaw Pact countries" allied with the Soviet Union to create a branch of national service composed of "unarmed labor units that required neither military ranks nor oaths of allegiance to the flag" as a response to the resistance of many of the younger males who had refused to participate in compulsory military service.
- Construction began at the Mururoa atoll in the south Pacific Ocean as the first civilian workers arrived to convert the French Polynesian island into a nuclear test site for France's Centre d'Experimentations du Pacifique; in all, 57,750 people would work at the Mururoa site between 1964 and 1996.
- Christian Kerbler, a member of the South Tyrolean Liberation Committee, shot two of his comrades, killing Alois Amplatz and wounding Georg Klotz, two of the most notorious terrorists in South Tyrol. Kerbler was captured by the Italian police, but escaped. Klotz fled to Austria, but was arrested on September 9 by Austria's police, the Gendarmerie. Kerbler feared that Amplatz and Klotz would discover that he was a double agent and a police informant, although another theory was that he was acting as a hitman for the Italian secret services.
- Born:
  - Eazy-E (stage name for Eric Lynn Wright), American rapper, founder of Ruthless Records, and co-founder of the gangsta rap group N.W.A (d. 1995); in Compton
  - Andy Hug, Switzerland-born martial artist, 1992 karate World Cup champion and 1996 World Kickboxing Association champion (d. 2000); in Zürich
  - Pierpoljak, French reggae and pop singer.
  - Houda Nonoo, Bahraini diplomat.
- Died:
  - Walter A. Brown, 59, American sports executive, died of a massive heart attack. Brown had founded the Boston Celtics and co-founded the Basketball Association of America and helped in the merger that created the National Basketball Association. Since 1951, Brown had been owner of both the NBA Celtics and the NHL's Boston Bruins.
  - Georges Thierry d'Argenlieu, 75, French priest, diplomat, naval officer and admiral

== September 8, 1964 (Tuesday) ==
- With the day after Labor Day being the opener at the time for most schools in the United States, the first school opening since the passage of the Civil Rights Act of 1964 marked the end of prohibiting American children from attending a particular public school because of their race, although school systems were allowed a time to develop plans for full integration. Desegregation proceeded peacefully in places where it had been fiercely opposed, including Montgomery, Alabama; Gadsden, Alabama; Albany, Georgia; Columbus, Georgia; and Mount Sterling, Kentucky. However, officials in Canton, Mississippi, turned away 13 black students from the town's all-white high school, and announced they would not allow integration until receiving a formal court order.
- Public schools reopened in Prince Edward County, Virginia, for the first time in five years, after the county was ordered by a federal court to comply with the desegregation requirements of the Civil Rights Act of 1964. Since 1959, county school officials had taken the unusual step of keeping the white and black schools closed rather than to obey an order to desegregate. On the first day of classes, only seven of the nearly 1,400 students were white, with the rest of the county's 1,200 white children continuing classes at the county's private all-white high school.
- The East German government decided to allow its nation's pensioners to visit family in West Germany or West Berlin. The East German news agency ADN reported that party secretary Walter Ulbricht had made the decision to allow thousands of elderly East Germans to visit their children and grandchildren in the West, something that previously had been limited to allowing the pensioners an exit visa to leave permanently, and only then if petitioned for by the International Red Cross.
- Todor Zhivkov, leader of the Bulgarian Communist Party and the government of the People's Republic of Bulgaria, issued the Amnesty Act to provide for amnesty for nearly all political prisoners who had been arrested between 1944 and 1951 during the early days of the Communist takeover. The act had been "passed to coincide with the 20th anniversary of the 'socialist revolution' on 9 September 1944."
- The High National Council of South Vietnam, a triumvirate of generals to lead South Vietnam until a civilian government could be permitted, was installed by the Military Revolutionary Council (MRC) under American pressure. The council was headed by Duong Van Minh and included Nguyen Khanh and Tran Thien Khiem.
- Raman Sankar was forced to resign as Chief Minister of the Indian state of Kerala, after state legislators in the capital at Thiruvananthapuram voted 72 to 50 in favor of a motion of no confidence in Sankar's government.
- Born:
  - Scott Levy, American professional wrestler and multiple WWE Hardcore Championship titlist, known by his ring name, Raven; in Philadelphia
  - Mitchell Whitfield, American film and TV actor; in Brooklyn

== September 9, 1964 (Wednesday) ==
- President Johnson held his first meeting since the Gulf of Tonkin incident with his ambassador to South Vietnam, Maxwell D. Taylor and with national security advisers and raised the question of "whether anyone doubted Vietnam was worth the effort" of going to war; at the time, everyone present agreed that it was necessary to fight in order to protect the credibility of the United States worldwide. According to notes taken of the meeting, Taylor said that the U.S. "could not afford to let Hanoi win, in terms of our overall position in the area and in the world". General Earle Wheeler, the new Chairman of the Joint Chiefs of Staff, said that the joint chiefs agreed "that if we should lose in South Vietnam, we would lose Southeast Asia", after which "country after country on the periphery would give way and look toward Communist China as the rising power of the area."
- North Korea's chairman Kim Il Sung spoke at a rally in Sinuiju and announced that "From now on, all new major plants must be built underground instead of on the surface" in order to protect the Communist nation's industry from aerial bombardment. Over the next ten years, strategically important industries (such as munitions and chemicals) would have "a redundant set of more critical components constructed underground" to supplement the factories on the surface; decades later, an author would opine that North Korea "is probably the world's most heavily fortified country."
- Born: Aleksandar Hemon, Bosnian-American author, essayist, critic, television writer, and screenwriter; in Sarajevo, SR Bosnia and Herzegovina, Yugoslavia
- Died:
  - Sakari Tuomioja, 53, Prime Minister of Finland from 1953 to 1954 and later the United Nations mediator in the Cyprus dispute, died 24 days after suffering a stroke while in Geneva."Sakari Tuomioja, U.N. Mediator In Cyprus Dispute, Dead at 53; Finnish Envoy Also Served as ‘Presence’ in Laos", The New York Times, September 9, 1964, p. 35
  - H. N. Sanyal, 62, the Solicitor General of India, was strangled in his bedroom in New Delhi. Sanyal was the apparent victim of a burglary.

== September 10, 1964 (Thursday) ==
- Canada's Prime Minister Lester Pearson ended the debate over attempting to get the parliament to adopt a maple leaf design for the Flag of Canada, and agreed to send the matter instead to a 15-member committee of Progressive Conservative and Liberal MPs. "As a compromise", a reporter noted at the time, "Canada has been flying the Canadian red ensign... with the Union Jack in the upper staff quarter and the Canadian coat of arms on the red field." In more recent weeks, debate over the flag had been occupying four days a week of time in the House of Commons. The Progressive Conservative leader of the opposition, John G. Diefenbaker, "was elated at what he believed was the end of the 'Pearson pennant," and "bound himself to accept the committee's recommendation if it was 'virtually' unanimous"; on October 29, the committee would recommend a design of red vertical bars and a single maple leaf, which would ultimately become Canada's flag.
- Three international agreements were signed at Paris by the 10 members of Europe's International Commission on Civil Status (ICCS), with the ICCS member governments agreeing on conventions "to facilitate the celebration of marriages abroad"; "the exchange of information relating to acquisition of nationality"; and "decisions concerning the rectification of civil status records". At the time, the ICCS was composed of the 10 EEC nations (Belgium, France, Italy, Luxembourg, the Netherlands, and West Germany) as well as Switzerland, Turkey, Greece and Austria.
- The African Development Bank (AfDB) was founded under the leadership of the United Nations Economic Commission for Africa (ECA). On August 4, 1963, an agreement was signed in Khartoum in the Sudan by governors of the central banks of 23 African nations. The majority of the AfDB's initial capital (65 percent) was subscribed by 20 of the African nations.
- The Convention on the Territorial Sea and the Contiguous Zone, signed at the United Nations on April 29, 1958, went into effect after ratification of the required number of nations.
- Hurricane Dora made landfall near St. Augustine, Florida, with winds of 110 mph (175 km/h), becoming the first tropical cyclone on record to make landfall in the region.
- Born:
  - Raymond Cruz, American character actor
  - Yegor Letov, Russian punk rock musician (d. 2008)
  - Jack Ma, Chinese business magnate and billionaire who founded the Alibaba Group of internet businesses; as Ma Yun in Hangzhou, Zhejiang

== September 11, 1964 (Friday) ==
- The Beatles performed for the first time in the "Deep South" when they played a concert in Jacksonville, Florida, at the Gator Bowl stadium as part of their 1964 North American tour. When the concert had originally been booked, the stadium had separate sections for whites and blacks (and "Eastern Meadow-Golds" (Asians) were not allowed); the group conditioned their appearance on being able to perform before a desegregated audience (which would become a moot point after the signing of the Civil Rights Act in July).
- In Barcelona, the Diada was celebrated for the first time since the end of the Spanish Civil War and the beginning of the dictatorship of Francisco Franco in Spain, as about 3,000 Catalan-speaking residents defied a ban against advocating Catalan nationalism. The Diada Nacional de Catalunya memorializes the day in 1714 when Catalonia had lost its independence. The protest was broken up and seven of its organizers were arrested and given heavy fines.
- Fight of the Week, the live boxing program shown on the ABC television network for four seasons, was telecast for the last time, bringing an end to the weekly prime time telecast of boxing bouts that had been popular in the United States since the advent of network television in 1946. Fight of the Week had started in 1960 after NBC's Cavalcade of Sports had ended. The last fight was Dick Tiger defeating Don Fullmer in a bout in Cleveland.
- Reino Lehto retired from being Prime Minister of Finland and was replaced by Johannes Virolainen.
- Born: Mo Abudu, Nigerian talk show host (Moments with Mo) and network executive (Ebonylife TV), described as "Africa's Most Successful Woman" and "The Oprah Winfrey of Africa"; as Monsunmola Abudu in Hammersmith
- Died: Gajanan Madhav Muktibodh, 46, Hindi poet, essayist, literary and political critic, and fiction writer

== September 12, 1964 (Saturday) ==
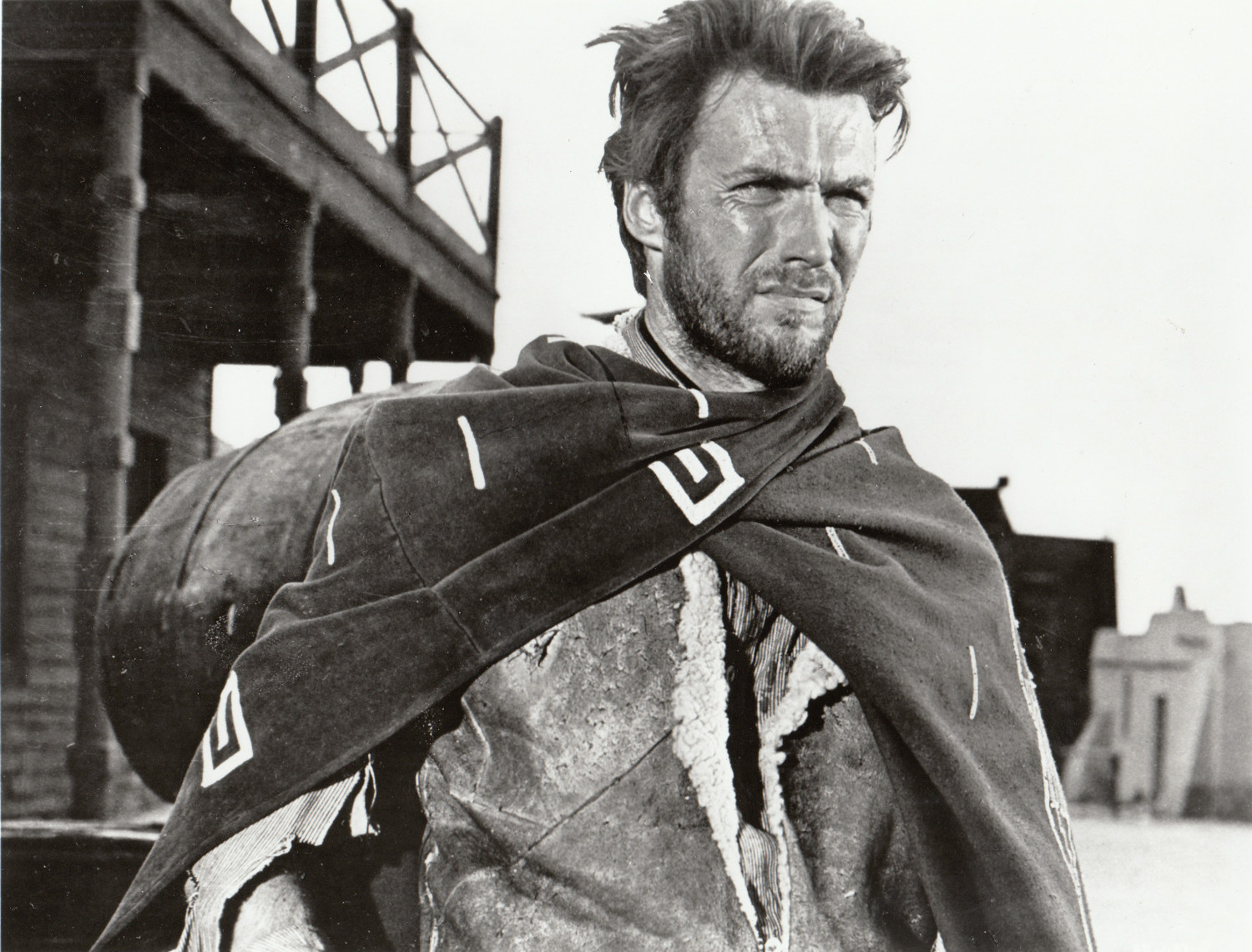
Clint Eastwood as "The man with no name".

- Sergio Leone's A Fistful of Dollars (Per un pugno di dollari), and starring American actor Clint Eastwood in his first leading role, had its world premiere at the Supercinema in suburban Florence. The film grossed 1.4 million lira in just four days. This success of the film, unexpected by the filmmakers, paved the way for a wave of the "spaghetti westerns" in the 1960s and 1970s.
- Ralph Boston broke the world record for the long jump, leaping 27 feet, 4 1/4 inches at the U.S. Olympic team qualifying trials in Los Angeles. Boston's leap was an inch greater than the official mark set by Igor Ter-Ovanesyan of the Soviet Union in 1962. Boston had actually jumped as far as 27' 10 1/4" earlier in the meet, but the mark did not qualify because the windspeed behind him exceeded 2.0 meters per second.
- Following the controversy created by the "Daisy Ad" that the Lyndon Johnson campaign had aired on national television five days earlier, Chairman John M. Bailey of the Democratic National Committee and Chairman Dean Burch of the Republican National Committee signed a fairness pledge agreeing not to run any more negative advertisements for the remainder of the 1964 presidential campaign.
- Canyonlands National Park was established in Utah as the 32nd national park in the United States.
- Born:
  - Greg Gutfeld, American political commentator and host of the late-night talk show Gutfeld!; in San Mateo, California
  - Paola Turci, Italian singer, in Rome

== September 13, 1964 (Sunday) ==
- The Sierra Aránzazu, a freighter from Spain, was attacked by gunboats and sunk off the coast of Cuba, and its captain, first mate and chief engineer were killed by gunfire. A group of Cuban exiles, opposed to Cuba's Fidel Castro and part of the American-funded Movimiento Revoluionario Rebelde paramilitary group, had attacked the Spanish ship after mistaking it for a Cuban vessel, the Sierra Maestra. The ensuing scandal was an embarrassment to the Johnson presidency's relations with Spain, "generated a major reevaluation within the administration of the wisdom of continuing the CIA's clandestine support of paramilitary operations", and "marked the beginning of a slow, protracted, shutdown of active CIA support for violent anti-Castro activities."
- Police in West Germany, aided by U.S. Army soldiers, fought a gun battle with East Germany border guards as an East German man fled across the Berlin Wall from the East's Friedrichshain district to the West Berlin Kreuzberg district. "Because communist bullets were hitting West Berlin territory," a police officer told reporters, "West Berlin police on duty at the wall opened fire." U.S. Army Specialist 4th Class Hans W. Puhl of East Weymouth, Massachusetts, a military policeman and a native of Bremerhaven, was praised by his commander for holding off the border guards with a pistol and throwing a tear gas grenade while civilians and firemen came to the aid of Michel Meyer, who was wounded while scaling the wall.
- In South Vietnam, the ruling junta of General Nguyễn Khánh was threatened by a coup attempt headed by Generals Lâm Văn Phát and Dương Văn Đức. The coup attempt collapsed the next day.
- Born: Tavis Smiley, African-American TV and radio talk show host; in Gulfport, Mississippi

== September 14, 1964 (Monday) ==
- The third session of the Vatican Council was opened by Pope Paul VI, who reaffirmed the doctrine of papal supremacy in his speech before the 2,500 council delegates, but added that it did not limit the authority of bishops. "As successors of Peter and possessors of full powers over the entire church," the Pope said, "we have the duty of heading the body of the episcopate. But our position in no way defrauds you your authority." The Pope broke with tradition and invited women to be present at the Council in a role as observers. "We are delighted to welcome among the auditors our beloved daughters in Christ," he said, "the first women in history to participate in a conciliar assembly."
- Voyage to the Bottom of the Sea, an American science fiction television series based on a successful 1961 film of the same name, premiered on the ABC network at 7:30 in the evening and began a four-season run. Starring Richard Basehart and David Hedison, the show tracked the adventures of the nuclear submarine Seaview in the then-future year of 1973. Its last original episode would be telecast on March 31, 1968.
- Pop-Tarts were introduced by the Kellogg company, maker of breakfast cereals, as pre-cooked pastries that were designed to be warmed up in a toaster, starting with a test marketing in grocery stores in Cleveland, Ohio. Kellogg's rival, the C. W. Post company, had developed a toaster pastry first but made the mistake of announcing "Country Squares", months before it was ready to distribute its product.
- Rod Laver defeated Ken Rosewall to win the London Indoor Professional Tennis Championship at Wembley Arena, the first of his four successive wins in the tournament.
- The Daily Herald of London published its final issue.
- Born: Faith Ford, American TV actress and comedian known for Murphy Brown and Hope & Faith; as Alexis Ford in Alexandria, Louisiana

== September 15, 1964 (Tuesday) ==
- The first issue of The Sun newspaper, which supported the Labour Party, was published to supersede The Daily Herald. Its inaugural editorial commented that "Steaks, cars, houses, refrigerators, washing machines are no longer the prerogative of the 'upper crust', but the right of all. People believe, and The Sun believes with them, that the division of Britain into social classes is hopelessly out of date. Public taste has been uplifted... For all those millions of people with lively minds and fresh ambitions, The Sun will stimulate the New Thinking." A historian would write half a century later, "The Sun was, therefore— strange as it may seem today— a left-wing newspaper and it was not until Rupert Murdoch bought it in 1969 that the now-familiar recipe of sensationalism, sex and sport was established." On November 17, 1969, Murdoch would relaunch the paper, which by then, had a lower circulation and advertising revenues than the Daily Herald had had in 1964, and would transform it into a tabloid with the slogan "The paper that cares about people. About the kind of world we live in."
- Soviet Premier Nikita Khrushchev claimed in a speech in Moscow that Soviet researchers had shown him "a monstrous new terrible weapon" that was "a means of the destruction and extermination of humanity." Addressing a delegation of legislators visiting from Japan, Khrushchev said, "I have never seen anything like it.... It is power without limit." Intelligence officials in London speculated that the Soviet premier was talking about the theoretical cobalt bomb; Khrushchev followed his announcement by saying, "We do not want to use such terrible weapons," without explaining why he would have had Soviet scientists produce a bomb that would destroy his own nation along with its enemies, and said, "we shall continue to press for peaceful co-existence and economic development, which are the sole hope of mankind." Two days later, Khrushchev would say at a reception at India's embassy that he had been misquoted. "I spoke to the Japanese in Russian and it was taken down in Japanese and then it was told in another language."
- Peyton Place, a prime time television soap opera based on the 1956 novel and the 1957 film of the same name, premiered on the ABC network. Initially shown with two episodes, and, later, three per week, the show would have 510 episodes in five seasons.
- British Prime Minister Sir Alec Douglas-Home called a general election for October 15 for the 630 members of the House of Commons. Queen Elizabeth II then dissolved parliament, effective September 25.
- The American Youth Soccer Organization was founded.
- Born: Robert Fico, Prime Minister of Slovakia since 2023, having served previously from 2006 to 2010 and from 2012 to 2018; in Topoľčany, Czechoslovakia (now Slovakia)

== September 16, 1964 (Wednesday) ==
- Edward Strong, the Chancellor of the University of California, Berkeley, United States, sent out a notice that would result in the Free Speech Movement, the first "student revolt" of the 1960s. Student activists had regularly set up tables near the "Sather Gate" on Bancroft Way at the edge of south side of the UC-Berkeley campus, across from the Berkeley, California, business district at Telegraph Avenue. The memorandum, approved while university president Clark Kerr was out of town, announced that, starting on Monday, "all tables, posters, fund-raising activities, membership drives, and speeches" would be prohibited at the location and that such practices would be allowed only in designated areas of the campus. "With hindsight," a historian would note later, "it was... not a particularly brilliant move on the part of the university administration to restrict the civil liberties of Berkeley's students, as many of the tables along Bancroft were manned by individuals aiming to support the efforts of such groups as SNCC and CORE."
- Shindig!, a U.S. television program featuring many top musical acts of the 1960s, is first broadcast on ABC at 8:30 p.m. Eastern time. Performers on the first show included Sam Cooke, The Everly Brothers, Donna Loren, The Righteous Brothers, The Wellingtons, and The Blossoms. One critic commented that "it has none of the blaring dullness that has turned up, for example, on Dick Clark's American Bandstand" and another noted that "we were spared the shallow utterances of an 'all right, kids' type of announcer. To be sure, there was an announcer, but he kept his mouthings to a minimum."

== September 17, 1964 (Thursday) ==
- In a speech in Sacramento, California, U.S. President Johnson disclosed that the United States had a pair of defense systems in place "to assure that no nation will be tempted to use the reaches of space as a platform for weapons of mass destruction... systems capable of destroying bomb-carrying satellites." He added that the top secret program had started in 1962 and that "We now have developed and tested two systems with the ability to intercept and destroy armed satellites circling the Earth in space. I can tell you today that these systems are in place, they are operationally ready, and they are on alert to protect this nation and the free world."
- The National Museum of Anthropology (Museo Nacional de Antropología) was inaugurated in Mexico by President Adolfo Lopez Mateos, amassing artifacts from the ancient Aztec, Maya and Toltec civilizations. "The Mexican people raise this monument", President Lopez told a multinational audience, "in honor of the admirable cultures that flourished during the pre-Columbian era in regions that are today territories of the republic. Before the testimonies of these cultures, the Mexico of today pays homage to indigenous Mexico, in whose example it recognizes the essential characteristics of its national originality."
- The popular TV fantasy sitcom Bewitched, starring Elizabeth Montgomery as a witch who has married an ordinary advertising executive (Dick York), began the first of eight seasons on the ABC network. Reviews of the first episode were mixed, with one critic calling it "a situation comedy that's magically merry" while Associated Press columnist Cynthia Lowry called it "disappointing" as "Miss Montgomery evoked her best tricks by wiggling her nose like a rabbit, made dishes move, windows fly open and trays spill."
- The Tokyo Monorail commenced operations, just 23 days ahead of the opening ceremony for the 1964 Summer Olympics. Upon opening, the monorail operated between the Hamamatsuchō and Haneda stations, making no intermediate stops. It has since been expanded with infill stations and extensions, and there are plans to extend it to Tokyo Station in the future.
- The third James Bond film, Goldfinger, held its world premiere at the Odeon Leicester Square in London before being released throughout the UK the following day. Goldfinger remains one of the most successful and popular Bond films ever made.
- Exercising its power as one of the five permanent members of the United Nations Security Council, the Soviet Union vetoed a resolution calling upon Indonesia to withdraw its forces from Malaysia.
- The American cargo ship Penn Carrier ran aground and blocked the Suez Canal, temporarily halting travel between the Mediterranean Sea and the Indian Ocean.
- Died: Clive Bell, 83, British art critic

== September 18, 1964 (Friday) ==
- The Warren Commission, charged with investigating the 1963 assassination of President John F. Kennedy, held its final meeting before the scheduled September 24 submission date of its report to U.S. President Johnson. While the commission would vote to accept the "single-bullet theory" endorsed by the staff's investigators (that the bullet from the first gunshot that struck the President also struck Texas Governor John Connally), the majority would turn out later to have been 4 to 3. Earl Warren, Gerald R. Ford, Allen Dulles and John J. McCloy endorsed the conclusion, while Hale Boggs, John Sherman Cooper and Richard Russell Jr. "thought it improbable".
- Betty Caywood became the first woman in the modern era to broadcast a Major League Baseball game, after being hired by Kansas City Athletics owner Charles O. Finley to provide color commentary for the team's radio network. Ms. Caywood, a meteorologist for a Chicago TV station, offered insight while Monte Moore and Bill Bryson called the play-by-play in the Athletics' 6 to 0 loss to the New York Yankees in the Bronx. A researcher would note later that Helen Dettwiler, a champion golfer, had appeared on baseball broadcasts for the General Mills sports network during the 1940s.
- At least 38 members of the United States Senate chose to stay away from a vote on a remapping of congressional districts. On the first roll call, fewer than 40 members answered the roll call, and the Senate's Sergeant at Arms, Joseph C. Duke, was ordered to search Washington for missing Senators and, if necessary, arrest them so that a quorum of 51 could be present for a vote to take place. After an hour, Duke was able to bring the number present up to 49, still short of a quorum. At the time, 22 of the U.S. Senators who were campaigning for re-election were believed to have a good reason to be out of town but, as one report noted, "The other 29 absentees had no such excuse."
- On American TV, the ABC network introduced two new shows that would become popular in syndication. Jonny Quest, an animated cartoon about a boy who accompanies his scientist father on adventures, made its debut, in color, at 7:30 p.m. Eastern time. Although it would only run one season, its 26 episodes would be seen in reruns for decades. At 8:30, The Addams Family, a sitcom based on the macabre cartoons of Charles Addams in the magazine The New Yorker, began the first of two seasons and 64 episodes.
- In a matter similar to the second Gulf of Tonkin incident with the USS Turner Joy, two other destroyers, the USS Morton and the USS Richard S. Edwards detected radar signals and concluded that an attack from North Vietnamese patrol boats was imminent. The destroyers fired multiple shells, but, as with the Turner Joy incident, were ultimately unable to locate any enemy vessels.
- Dr. Martin Luther King Jr., African-American civil rights leader and a minister in the Southern Baptist church, was granted an audience with the leader of the Roman Catholic Church, Pope Paul VI, at the Vatican. The two religious leaders spoke for 25 minutes.
- In Athens, King Constantine II married Princess Anne-Marie of Denmark in the last royal wedding in Greece. Only nine days after her 18th birthday, Anne-Marie became Europe's youngest queen. Guests at the ceremony included eight reigning monarchs.
- Died: Seán O'Casey, 84, Irish dramatist

== September 19, 1964 (Saturday) ==
- The Danish dredging ship Kaptajn Nielsen capsized in Moreton Bay off the coast of Queensland, Australia, killing nine crew and trapping 13 more, who had to rely upon the limited air provided by a trapped air pocket. One crew member, 21-year-old Erik Paulsen, succeeded in swimming his way from the air pocket down and out of the hull and subsequently swam for three hours to reach Moreton Island and alert authorities. The other twelve crew remained trapped for twelve hours in rapidly fouling air before a team of divers was eventually able to locate and rescue them from the capsized hull.
- Cult leader and survivalist John Robert Harrell, who had created the Christian-Patriots Defense League, was arrested after 17 months as a fugitive. In arresting Harrell, the sheriff of Lawrence County, Arkansas, discovered two teenage girls who had been missing for nearly a year. A meter reader had reported his suspicion that someone was being held captive in the house, prompting Sheriff Kenneth Guthrie to investigate Harrell's home.
- At the Last Night of the Proms, Sir Malcolm Sargent conducted the BBC Symphony Orchestra in works by Hector Berlioz, Pyotr Ilyich Tchaikovsky, Alan Rawsthorne, Felix Mendelssohn and Richard Strauss.
- Flipper, a television adventure series starring a dolphin and the family that has befriended him, began the first of three seasons on the NBC network. The show was based on a 1963 film of the same name.
- Born:
  - Yvonne Vera, Zimbabwean novelist (d. 2005); in Bulawayo, Southern Rhodesia (now Zimbabwe)
  - Kim Richards, American actress, socialite, and television personality; in Mineola, New York

== September 20, 1964 (Sunday) ==
- Steeplechase Park, a United States amusement park that had operated on Brooklyn's Coney Island for 68 summers, closed permanently at 7:35 in the evening. The farewell was marked with a band playing Auld Lang Syne and a bell tolling 68 times, marking the end of its 68th year. One author present would recount that "Thousands of lights were switched off slowly, row after row on each toll of the bell. As it turned out, the park went dark for the last time." Four days earlier, the Bronx's amusement park, Freedomland U.S.A., had closed its doors and filed for bankruptcy after five-seasons as "The World's Largest Entertainment Center".
- The only political party allowed in Algeria, Ahmed Ben Bella's National Liberation Front, received 86.8% approval in a yes-no vote in the Algerian parliamentary election. Official figures showed that 671,430 voters (13%) out of the 5,177,631 cast disapproved of the slate of candidates for the 138 seat National Assembly.
- The 339-ton Japanese tanker Nikka Maru sank immediately, drowning all nine of its crewmen, moments after colliding with the much larger (11,223 tons) British freighter Eastern Take off Nagoya, Japan.
- Born: Maggie Cheung, Hong Kong film actress; as Cheung Man-yuk in British Hong Kong

== September 21, 1964 (Monday) ==
- The Philadelphia Phillies baseball team, in first place in the National League and 6 1/2 games ahead of its opponents with only 12 games left in the season, began a losing streak that would later be referred to in Phillies lore as "The Curse of Chico Ruiz". Ruiz, a rookie for the Cincinnati Reds was on third base with two men out in the sixth inning, and "stole home" in what a reporter would refer to the next day as a "dumb, dumb baseball play", and scoring the lone run in a 1–0 loss for Philadelphia. The loss was the first of ten in a row for the Phils, which would conclude with a loss to the eventual pennant-winner, the St. Louis Cardinals, on September 30.
- The island nation of Malta became independent after 164 years of rule by the United Kingdom. The flag raising ceremony, with Britain's Prince Philip appearing on behalf of his wife, Queen Elizabeth II, took place at Floriana, near the capital city, Valletta. Maurice Henry Dorman, who had been the colonial governor since 1962, became the first Governor-General of Malta and Giorgio Borġ Olivier continued as Prime Minister. The State of Malta would become a presidential republic on December 13, 1974.
- The North American XB-70 Valkyrie flew for the first time, piloted by North American Aviation's Alvin S. White and U.S. Air Force Colonel Joseph F. Cotton. It departed the runway at North American's test facility at Palmdale, California, at 8:38 in the morning and, though capable of flying more than 2,000 miles per hour (3,200 km/h) at high altitudes, did not exceed 280 knots (about 322 mph or 519 km/h).
- The United States kept yachting's America's Cup for the 20th consecutive time since the competition began in 1851, as the 12-metre (39 ft) Constellation, owned by the New York Yacht Club and skippered by Eric Ridder and Bob Bavier, won the fourth race in a sweep of the best-of-seven series against the Royal Thames Yacht Club and its boat, Sovereign, captained by Paul Anderson.
- Born: Dr. Jorge Drexler, Uruguayan ear, nose and throat specialist and Academy Award-winning songwriter; in Montevideo
- Died:
  - Otto Grotewohl, 70, East Germany's Chairman of the Council of Ministers and head of government since the nation's founding in 1949. Communist Party Secretary Walter Ulbricht appointed Willi Stoph to replace Grotewohl.
  - Raymond Brutinel, 82, French-born Canadian entrepreneur and pioneer in mechanized warfare

== September 22, 1964 (Tuesday) ==
- Fiddler on the Roof opened at the Imperial Theatre on Broadway for the first of 3,242 performances. The musical, with music by Jerry Bock and lyrics by Sheldon Harnick, was based on the stories of Sholem Aleichem. Actor Zero Mostel starred in the lead role of Tevye, father of five daughters. Before opening on Broadway, the play had been perfected during the summer in performances in Washington, D.C. and in Detroit. The final performance of the original production would take place on July 2, 1972.
- The NBC network introduced The Man from U.N.C.L.E., an adventure show created in the wake of the popularity of spy films. Starring Robert Vaughn and David McCallum, the series about the fictitious "United Network Command for Law and Enforcement" would have 105 episodes in four seasons. Critics were generally negative, with comments like "Plagiarism isn't quite the word for this; Bond and his opposite number, Napoleon Solo, are more like killing cousins," and "it just doesn't prove very entertaining", while UPI critic Rick DuBrow, noting that Vaughn was "looking forward to the day when he can quit acting", said, "There's no time like the present."
- The Coyote Canyon Fire broke out near Santa Barbara, California, after being initially caused by a car's faulty exhaust. It would rage for several days, burning 67,000 acres (105 mi^{2} or 271 km^{2}) of backcountry, along with 106 homes.
- An Triail (The Trial), a play written by Máiréad Ní Ghráda and performed entirely in the Irish language, was given its first performance.
- Died: Jimmy Pardue, 33, American NASCAR driver, was killed while he was doing a "tire test" for Goodyear at the Charlotte Motor Speedway." Pardue would finish in fifth place in the 1964 Grand National Series of NASCAR races, which still had eight events left.

== September 23, 1964 (Wednesday) ==
- Charles Helou, the former Education Minister and a former editor of a French-language newspaper, was inaugurated as President of Lebanon.
- In Saudi Arabia, the new College of Petroleum and Minerals held its first classes, with 67 young men enrolling at its campus in Dhahran. By 1975, it had become a public university and, in 1986, would be renamed for the reigning monarch as King Fahd University of Petroleum and Minerals. As of 2016, it would have an enrollment of 10,000 students.
- In the United States, the new University of South Alabama held its first classes, becoming the first state-supported college institution in the 20th century in Alabama. Initial enrollment for the university, located in Mobile, was 750 students. Fifty years later, it would have almost 17,000 students.
- Peace negotiations between the government of India and the Naga National Council began in the village of Chedema, Kohima district.
- At the autumnal equinox, the Order of Bards, Ovates and Druids (OBOD) was founded in the UK.
- Died: Fred M. Wilcox, 56, American motion picture director best known for Forbidden Planet and for Lassie Come Home

== September 24, 1964 (Thursday) ==
- At 7:30 p.m. Eastern time, the CBS television network debuted The Munsters, a family comedy that, like ABC's new show The Addams Family, was created in the wake of the popularity of monster movies. Both shows would appear for two seasons, and both would be popular in syndication. Acknowledging the similar themes of the two shows, UPI critic Rick Du Brow would note that "'The Munsters, for instance, are almost lovable" and "perhaps wiser than the Addamses in playing their abnormality with more absolute normality", and another critic would comment that "to say the show won't be a hit would take more courage than facing up to Frankenstein inside a graveyard fence."
- In East Berlin, representatives of West Germany and East Germany signed a one-year agreement that would permit residents of West Berlin to visit relatives in the Communist nation during four designated holiday periods, starting in November. While residents of East Germany were still not allowed to travel to the west, and the terms did not apply to Germans outside of West Berlin, westerners with permits could cross through a door in the wall at the Oberbaum Bridge during periods coinciding with November, the Christmas and New Year's Day holidays, Easter, and the Whitsuntide period in the late spring.
- In Washington, the Warren Commission presented President Johnson with an 888-page summary of its investigation into the assassination of John F. Kennedy, with a pledge that the summary would be released to the public at 6:30 p.m. Eastern time on Sunday, September 27. The report was supplemented with "26 volumes of supporting documents, testimony, or depositions of 552 witnesses and more than 3,100 exhibits."
- A background briefing for the press regarding NASA astronomy programs was held in Washington. Nancy Roman, who directed the agency's astronomy activities, disclosed that NASA was studying the feasibility of a crewed orbiting telescope. Although the telescope would be designed to operate automatically, astronauts would adjust its focus, collect film packets, and make any necessary repairs.
- Born:
  - That Vegan Teacher (Kadie Karen Diekmeyer), controversial Canadian animal rights activist and former educator, mainly known for promoting veganism; in Montreal, Quebec
  - Rafael Palmeiro, Cuban-born American major league baseball player who had 3,020 hits and 569 home runs in his career; in Havana

== September 25, 1964 (Friday) ==
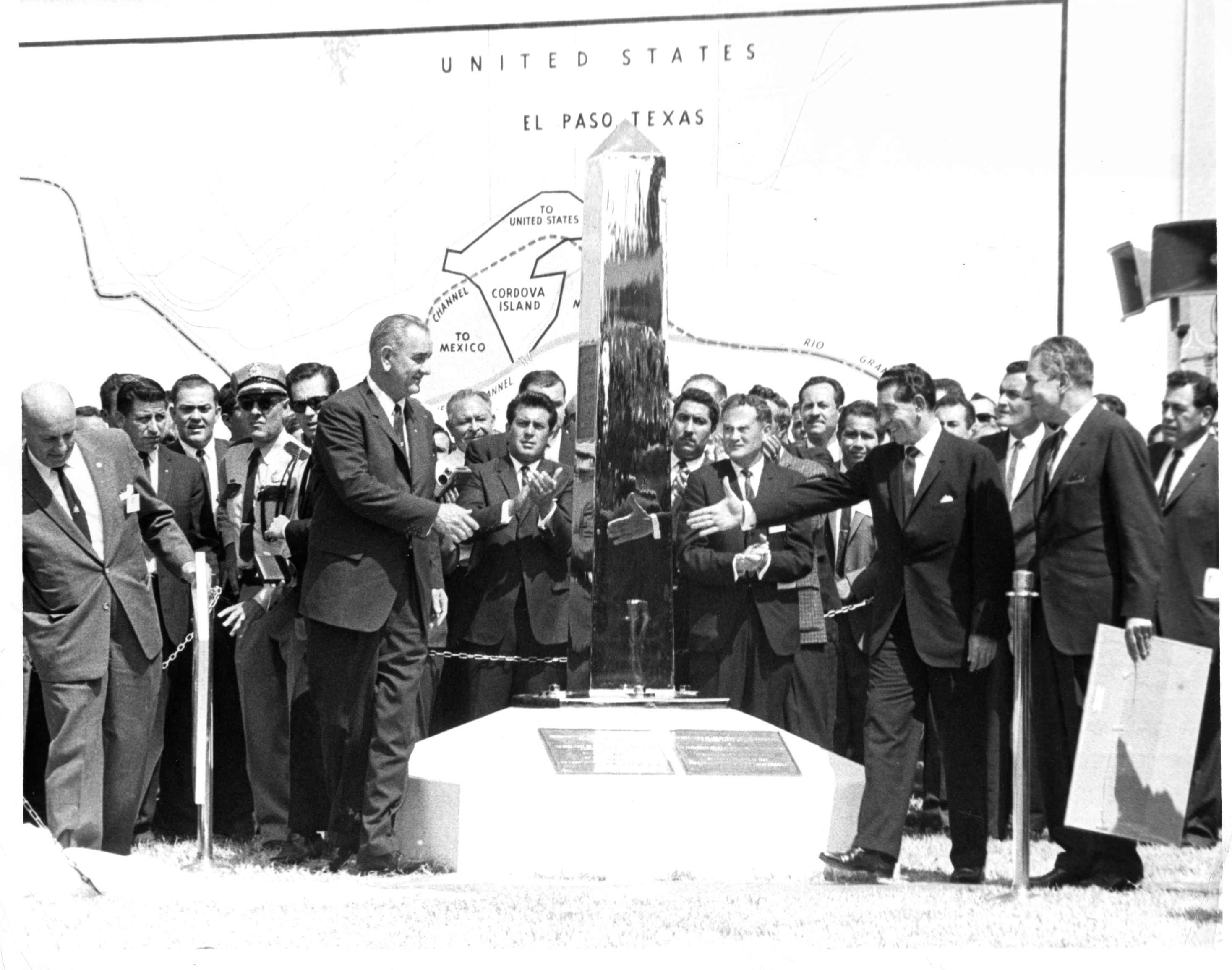
September 25, 1964: U.S. President Johnson and Mexican President López unveil the new boundary marker, settling the Chamizal dispute

- President Lyndon B. Johnson of the United States and President Adolfo López Mateos of Mexico shook hands at the center of the international bridge over the Rio Grande from Stanton Street in El Paso, Texas, to Avenida Lerdo in Ciudad Juarez, Chihuahua, to commemorate the two nations' agreement to settle the Chamizal dispute. Johnson and López then traveled to a ceremony in El Paso, followed by a visit to El Chamizal to unveil a marker for the new boundary marker for the 0.5-mile (0.80 km) northward shifting of the border.
- Later in the day, President Johnson flew to Oklahoma for the dedication of the new Eufaula Dam and spoke about national issues and the Vietnam War. In words not noted until after his escalation of the war, Johnson said "There are those that say you ought to go north and drop bombs, to try to wipe out the supply lines, and they think that would escalate the war. We don't want our American boys to do the fighting for Asian boys."
- U.S. presidential adviser McGeorge Bundy met with the Soviet Ambassador to the U.S., Anatoly Dobrynin, to discuss the possibility of joint action to prevent the People's Republic of China from becoming the fifth nation (after the U.S., the USSR, the UK and France) to develop nuclear weapons. President Johnson had already ruled out taking unilateral action on September 15; Dobrynin told Bundy that the Chinese nuclear capability was not a great concern and, according to Bundy's memorandum of the conversation, "gently remarked on the continued existence of the treaty" between the USSR and China. China would have its first successful nuclear bomb three weeks later, on October 16.
- FRELIMO, the Frente de Libertação de Moçambique (Mozambique Liberation Front), a nationalist group led by Dr. Eduardo Mondlane and dedicated to making the colony of Portuguese East Africa independent, launched the Mozambican War of Independence against the colonial armies of Portugal, in a battle that would continue for more than a decade. The first attack was on the Portuguese Army outpost at Chai, in the Cabo Delgado Province near the border with Tanzania; FRELIMO would later claim "simultaneous attacks on ten military outposts 'covering a vast area of the country'".
- At a meeting of the Privy Council of the United Kingdom, Queen Elizabeth II signed a proclamation dissolving "the longest peacetime parliament of modern time" and "the first to run its full five-year term since the term was reduced from seven years before World War I". The dissolution of the House of Commons marked the beginning of campaigning for the October 15 elections called by Prime Minister Douglas-Home.
- CBS introduced Gomer Pyle, U.S.M.C., a popular situation comedy starring Jim Nabors as a naive recruit to the United States Marine Corps and Frank Sutton as the boot camp's drill sergeant. Nabors continued the role that he had originated on The Andy Griffith Show. The show would be among the Top Ten most popular U.S. television programs in all five of its seasons.
- A cure for acute lymphocytic leukemia by the end of 1967 was forecast by the President of the American Cancer Society, Dr. Wendell G. Scott, who told delegates to the Society's 18th annual conference, "I predict that within the next three years, acute leukemia will be stricken from the list of human diseases."
- Born: Marc Benioff, American Internet entrepreneur and philanthropist; in San Francisco

== September 26, 1964 (Saturday) ==
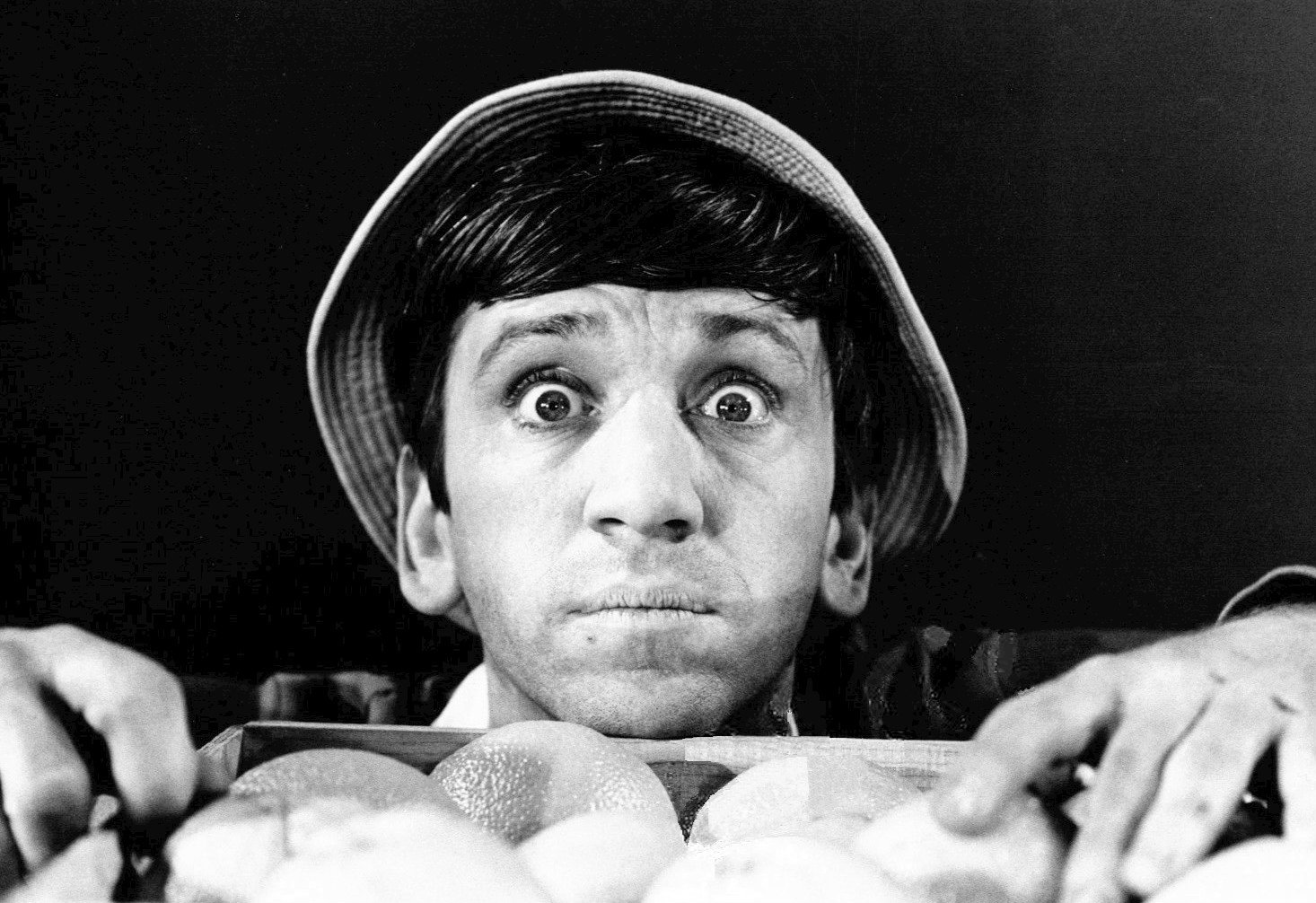
Bob Denver as "Gilligan"

- Gilligan's Island, a situation comedy starring Bob Denver as one of seven people marooned on a deserted island, made its debut on CBS at 8:30 in the evening. UPI critic Rick Dubrow commented afterward that "It is impossible that a more inept, moronic or humorless show has ever appeared on the home tube." After three seasons and 98 episodes, CBS would cancel the show, which would become extremely popular in syndication.
- At Stanleyville, seized by rebels on August 5 and proclaimed as the capital of the "People's Republic of the Congo" on September 5, President Christophe Gbenye ordered the rounding up of all foreigners trapped in Stanleyville and Paulis. Most of the hostages— 525— were Belgians, and about 200 were Greek or Italian; 63 Americans, 33 Canadians and 25 British people were also taken captive and held at hotels within the city; the rest were citizens from 12 other nations. Gbenye, whose forces had killed hundreds of Congolese nationals, threatened to kill the hostages. The crisis would force a rescue mission by Belgian and American troops on November 24.
- The "High National Council", with 17 civilian members, was installed to function as a legislature for South Vietnam, with Phan Khac Suu as the council's chairman. He would become the new head of state on October 26.
- The explosion of two large natural gas storage tanks injured more than 400 residents of the Copenhagen suburb of Valby, and at least four of the most critically hurt died in the blast.

== September 27, 1964 (Sunday) ==
- At 6:30 p.m., the Warren Commission Report of the investigation of the assassination of President John F. Kennedy was released to the public. The Commission concluded that Lee Harvey Oswald had acted alone in the slaying, that Kennedy had been inadequately protected during his November 22, 1963, visit to Dallas, and that there had been no conspiracy to commit, nor to cover up, the murder. Retired U.S. Army Major General Edwin A. Walker, who had been shot at by Oswald seven months before Kennedy's death, was among the first to criticize the report, commenting that "The Warren Commission from the beginning had the full intent... to show that Oswald was a 'Lone Ranger'."
- Without bloodshed, U.S. Army troops rescued 60 Vietnamese hostages and seized the main camp of Montagnard rebels operating at Buon Sar Pa near South Vietnam's frontier with Cambodia. The Americans flew in on 50 helicopters from the Ban Me Thuot East Airfield and picked up the hostages, then aided in placing the 470 rebels on a convoy of trucks.
- The TSR-2 strike and reconnaissance aircraft, developed by the British Aircraft Corporation (BAC) for the Royal Air Force (RAF), made its maiden flight. At 3:28 p.m. (as reported in The Guardian the next morning), the supersonic nuclear bomber took off from Boscombe Down in Wiltshire with Roland Beamont as the test pilot.
- In the 1964 All-Ireland Senior Football Championship Final, Galway defeated Kerry. It was the first of three All-Ireland football titles won by Galway in the 1960s. Galway and Down would both win three titles during the 1960s, sharing the role of "team of the decade".
- Born: Stephan Jenkins, American musician and lead singer, songwriter and guitarist for Third Eye Blind; in Indio, California
- Died: Adib Shishakli, 55, former President of Syria who had been forced to flee into exile after eight months of brutal rule, was shot to death by a man who had been orphaned by Shishakli's bombing of Druze Muslim settlements. Nawaf Ghazaleh traced Shishakli to Brazil, located him in the small city of Ceres, and had lunch with him at a downtown restaurant. As they walked out, Ghazaleh drew a pistol and shot the former president twice, then jumped into his car and drove out of town.

== September 28, 1964 (Monday) ==
- Republican presidential nominee Barry Goldwater announced that his leading choice for his Secretary of State would be Richard M. Nixon. Sources close to the campaign told reporters that other picks by a President Goldwater would be former General Electric chairman Ralph J. Cordiner for Secretary of the Treasury; retired U.S. Army General Lucius D. Clay for Secretary of Defense; campaign aide F. Clifton White for Attorney General; Idaho Governor Robert E. Smylie for Secretary of the Interior; Nebraska U.S. Senator Carl Curtis for Secretary of Agriculture; Motorola CEO Robert Galvin for Secretary of Commerce; and Clare Boothe Luce for Secretary of Health, Education and Welfare. No names were under consideration at the time for Secretary of Labor.
- Australia (represented by Roy Emerson and Fred Stolle) won the 1964 Davis Cup international tennis tournament, taking back the Cup from the United States team (Chuck McKinley and Dennis Ralston) in the fifth match of five. With the meeting in Cleveland tied at two matches apiece, Emerson lost the first set, 3–6, then beat McKinly 6–2, 6–4 and 6–4.
- Born: Janeane Garofalo, American comedienne and film actress; in Newton, New Jersey
- Died:
  - Harpo Marx, 75, American comedian and the second oldest of the Marx Brothers team. Born as Arthur Marx, Harpo was the one member of the group who did not speak during his performances.
  - Nacio Herb Brown, 68, American composer best known for the melody of "Singin' in the Rain" in the film of the same name.
  - George Dyson, 81, British composer

== September 29, 1964 (Tuesday) ==
- The Fort Worth Press, a newspaper in Fort Worth, Texas, revealed that a young man named Donald Wayne House had been jailed on November 22, 1963, on suspicion of the assassination of President Kennedy. House, a 22-year-old truck driver, had gone to Dallas earlier in the day and watched the presidential motorcade, and had stopped at the town of Grand Prairie to get gasoline. A woman at the station asked House "whether he had heard what the killer looked like" and, after he repeated "the description he had heard on the radio without realizing at the time it also fitted him", the woman called the police. She called the police, and House's car was pulled over when he arrived in Fort Worth, where he was told "You are being arrested for the assassination of President Kennedy." House was not booked, nor was his mug shot picture taken, but he was interrogated for three hours and then put in a jail cell. Hours later, after 24-year old Lee Harvey Oswald was arrested, House was released.
- Pope Paul VI hosted a group of 72 representatives of non-Catholic Christian denominations at the Sistine Chapel and, after praying with them, told them of his plans for an "interfaith study center". "This shows you, gentlemen and brothers, that the Catholic Church, while unable to abandon certain doctrinal exigencies to which she has the duty in Christ to remain faithful," the Pope said, "is nevertheless disposed to study how difficulties can be removed, misunderstandings dissipated, and the authentic treasures of truth and spirituality which you possess can be respected."
- In India, at least 200 residents of the town of Macherla were drowned by a 10-foot (3.0 m) high wall of water that swept through the municipality in the Indian state of Andhra Pradesh, following the bursting of the dam that held back the town's reservoir. According to reports from the area, the Chandravanka River was swollen by heavy rains; many of the dead had been patients in the local hospital who were drowned when the waters swept their beds away.
- Gemini Program Manager Charles W. Mathews presented the Gemini Management Panel with the new flight schedule resulting from the lightning strike and hurricane conditions. The schedule was as follows: Gemini 2, November 17; GT-3, January 30, 1965; and Gemini 4, April 12. For GT-4 through Gemini 7, three-month launch intervals were planned; for the remainder of the program, these intervals would be reduced to two-and-one-half months.
- The popular comic strip Mafalda, created in Buenos Aires by Joaquín Salvador Lavado (who went by the pen name Quino), made its first appearance, as a feature of the weekly magazine Primera Plana. The strip itself would run for less than nine years, ending on June 25, 1973, but would continue to be reprinted worldwide half a century later.
- U.S. Secretary of State Dean Rusk told reporters that he expected that China would explode a nuclear weapon "in the near future", a prediction that would be borne out on October 16.
- The LTV XC-142 VTOL experimental aircraft made its first flight.
- Died: Fred Tootell, American athlete and 1924 Olympic gold medalist for the hammer throw

== September 30, 1964 (Wednesday) ==
- The Fishery Limits Act 1964 went into effect, as the United Kingdom followed the trend of most nations in the north Atlantic Ocean and extended the limits of its exclusive zone for fishing rights from three nautical miles to 12 nmi (13.8 miles or 22.2 km) from its shores. The 12-nmi limit followed a "six plus six" pattern, with the first six nmi being exclusively for British fishing vessels, and the second six to include vessels for nations approved by the UK government. In 1976, Britain and the other European Economic Community members would extend their limits to 200 nautical miles (230 mi or 370 km).
- The U.S. Air Force gave its first public demonstration of "the world's fastest military aircraft", the Lockheed YF-12A, at a press conference at Edwards Air Force Base in California.

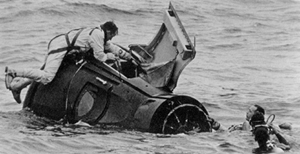
Gemini water egress training in April 1965

- Two days of testing by astronauts began of the Gemini space capsule, using capsule No. 5. While most of the post-landing systems were satisfactory, two crew members were uncomfortable while wearing their pressure suits in the Florida heat. Removing the suits helped, but the capsule interior was still too hot and humid. The test was stopped after 17 hours because of Hurricane Hilda. Another test was made on November 13 to see if opening the hatch would upon splashdown would be a solution, and the interior temperature dropped significantly. On November 16, an at-sea exit test was successful as astronauts left the spacecraft and latched its escape hatch after exit, confirming that the capsule could be recovered at sea even if the astronauts had to leave it.
- Born:
  - Trey Anastasio, American guitarist, vocalist and songwriter for the band Phish; as Ernest Anastasio III in Fort Worth, Texas
  - Monica Bellucci, Italian actress and model; in Città di Castello
  - Kwame Raoul, American attorney and politician, 42nd Attorney General of Illinois, in Chicago
