= August 1964 =

Month of 1964

<<	August 1964					>>
Su	Mo	Tu	We	Th	Fr	Sa
						1
2	3	4	5	6	7	8
9	10	11	12	13	14	15
16	17	18	19	20	21	22
23	24	25	26	27	28	29
30	31

August 2, 1964: North Vietnamese Navy torpedo boats confront USS Maddox (below) in the Gulf of Tonkin, escalation of Vietnam War follows

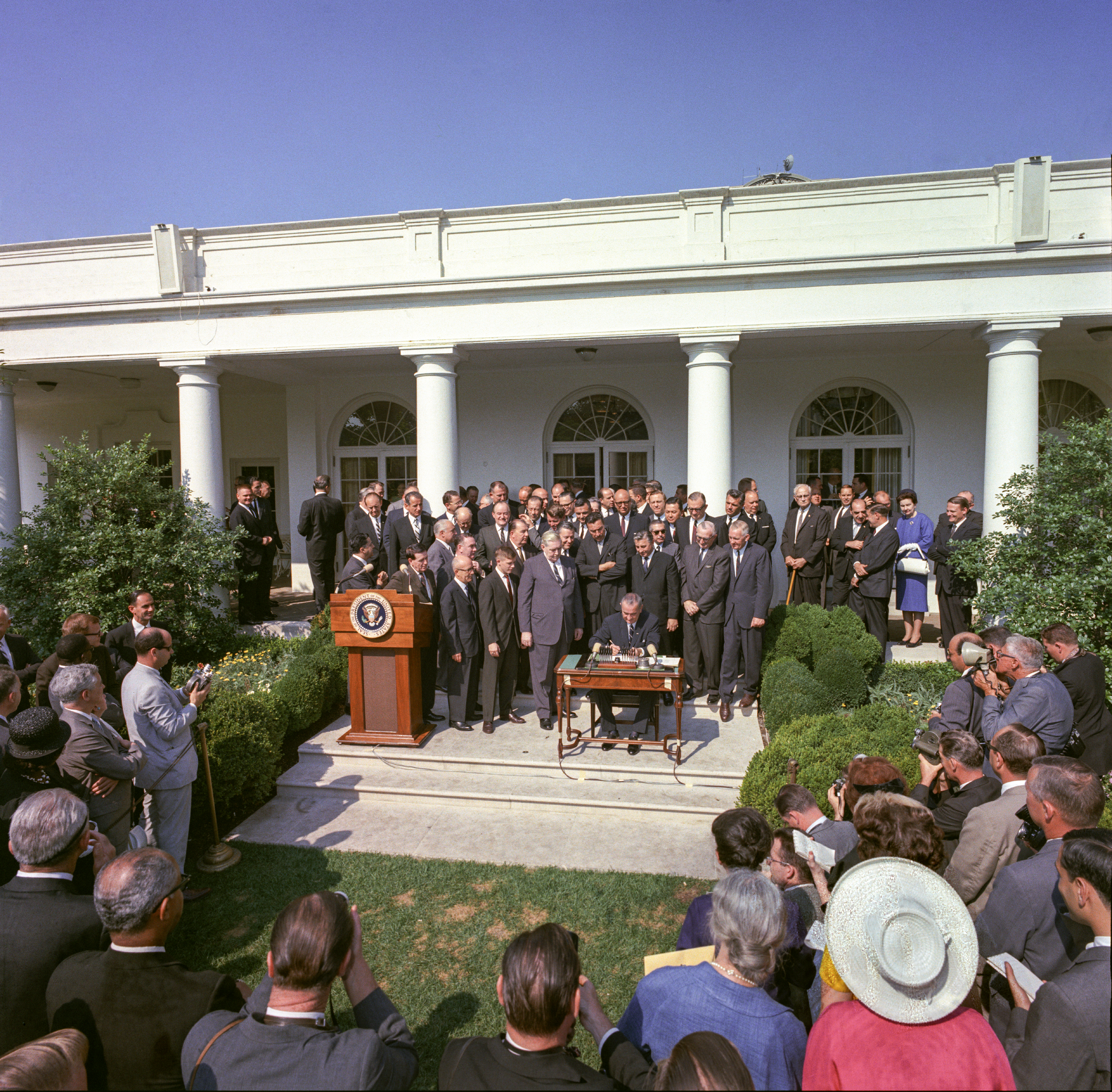
August 20, 1964: U.S. President Johnson signs the Economic Opportunity Act into law during the War on Poverty

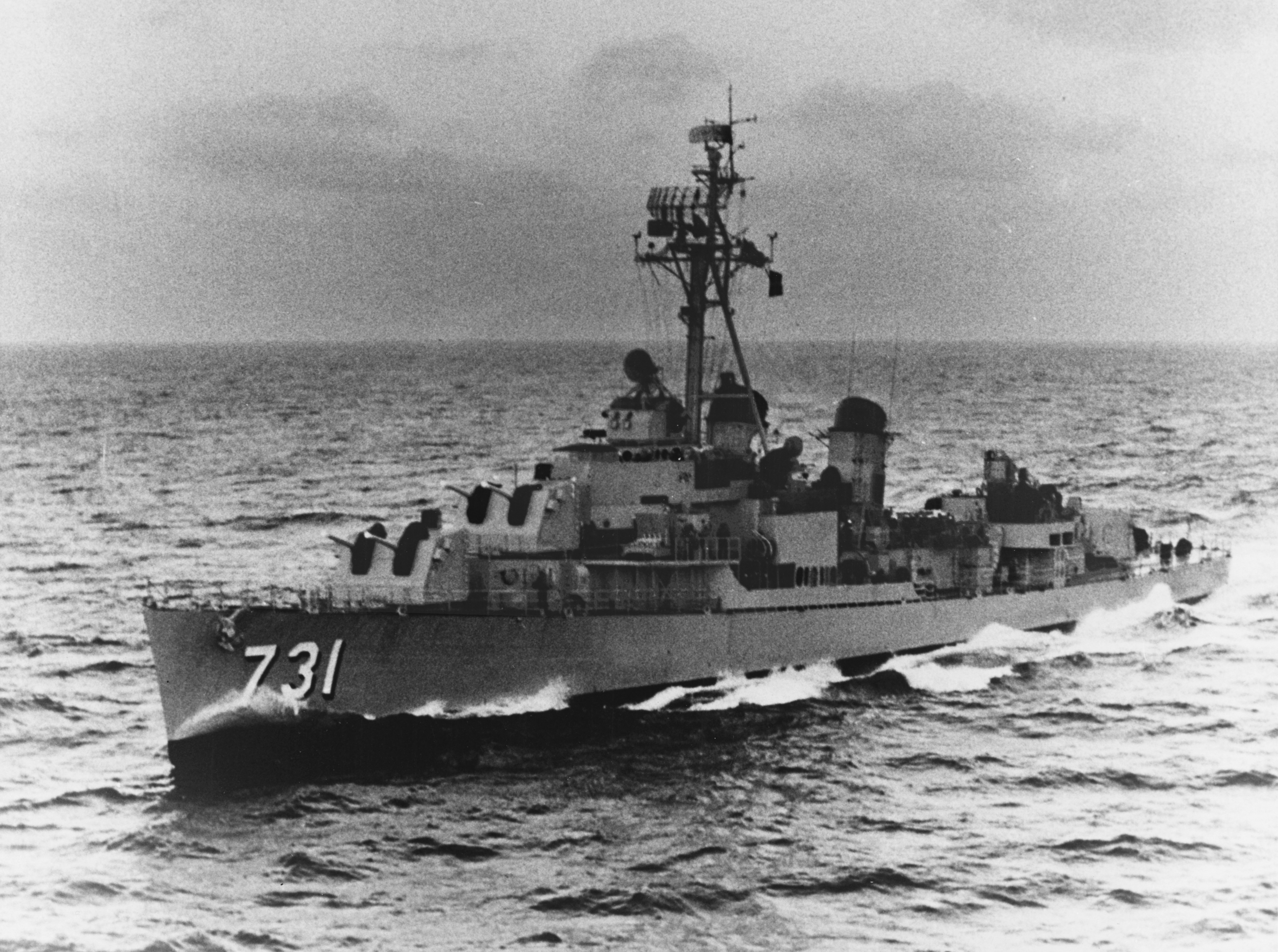
U.S. Navy destroyer USS Maddox (DD-731)

The following events occurred in August 1964:

== August 1, 1964 (Saturday) ==
- With the acceptance by voters of a new constitution, the former Belgian Congo officially changed its name from the "Republic of the Congo" to the "Democratic Republic of the Congo". Since 1960, both the former French Congo and the former Belgian Congo had referred to themselves as "Republic of the Congo" and had been distinguished as "Congo-Brazzaville" and "Congo-Léopoldville", respectively.
- Emancipation Day was first observed in Barbados, Bermuda, Guyana, St. Vincent and the Grenadines, Trinidad and Tobago, Turks and Caicos Islands, and Jamaica – as a celebration of the end of slavery during the British colonial era in the Caribbean.
- The final Looney Tune cartoon, Señorella and the Glass Huarache (a stereotypical portrayal of a "Mexican version" of the fairy tale of Cinderella), was released. Jack L. Warner would subsequently shut down the Warner Bros. Cartoon Division.

== August 2, 1964 (Sunday) ==
- The Gulf of Tonkin incident took place when the destroyer USS Maddox engaged three North Vietnamese Navy torpedo boats of the 135th Torpedo Squadron, while performing a signals intelligence patrol as part of DESOTO operations. Accounts from both sides agreed that the North Vietnamese fired first, with Commander Nguyen Van Tu of T-336 giving the order to launch the first torpedo, followed by the T-339 and the T-333. According to the U.S. Navy, the Maddox evaded two torpedoes at 4:08 in the afternoon local time, and at 4:21 the Maddox and a third Viet boat exchanged gunfire. During the battle, the Maddox spent over 280 three-inch and five-inch shells, and in which four U. S. Navy F-8 Crusader jet fighter bombers strafed the torpedo boats. One American aircraft was damaged, one 14.5 mm round hit the destroyer, four North Vietnamese torpedo boats were damaged, and four North Vietnamese sailors were killed and six wounded.
- Swimmers broke two world records on the final day of the Amateur Athletic Union's national championships in Los Altos, California, in a meet where competitors had set 10 new world bests. Murray Rose of Australia swam the men's 1,500-meter freestyle in 17 minutes, 1.8 seconds, and 15-year-old Sharon Stouder set a new mark for the women's 200-meter butterfly at 2 minutes, 26.4 seconds.
- The wreckage of a plane piloted by popular singer Jim Reeves was found near Brentwood, Tennessee, 42 hours after it crashed. Reeves' body had been thrown from the aircraft, while the body of his manager, Dean Manuel, was found inside the plane.
- British driver John Surtees won the 1964 German Grand Prix.
- Born: Mary-Louise Parker, American stage, television and film actress; in Fort Jackson, South Carolina
- Died: Carel Godin de Beaufort, 30, Dutch nobleman and motorsport driver; from injuries from crash during practice for the German Grand Prix

== August 3, 1964 (Monday) ==
- Followers of Alice Lenshina and the Lumpa sect attacked the town of Lundazi in Zambia and indiscriminately murdered residents they found on the streets, using hatchets, spears, arrows and gunfire. They then marched northward from Lundzi and attacked seven villages. At least 150 people were killed in the attack. Zambian troops and riot police counterattacked at the Lumpa village of Chipoma and killed 74 of the rebels, and Zambian President Kenneth Kaunda outlawed the Lumpa church. Lenshina would be captured, alive, 8 days later.
- The Central Committee of the Soviet Communist Party issued decree number 655–268, directing Vladimir Chelomey of the OKB-52 bureau to proceed on building rockets for a crewed landing on the Moon. The decree slowed the progress of the OKB-1 rocket design program headed by Sergei Korolev for a Soyuz lunar mission.
- Lyman Frain Sr., aged 80, became the oldest person to complete a transcontinental bicycle ride across the United States, arriving at the Golden Gate Bridge in San Francisco after a journey of 86 days and 3,244 miles (5,221 km). Frain had taken up the sport at the age of 72.
- At NASA, the Ad Hoc Astronomy Panel of the Orbiting Research Laboratory (ORL) issued its preliminary report about the opinion of American scientists on the validity of astronomical research by humans in space, and to define astronomy objectives for the ORL mission. The panel concluded that although sounding rocket and satellite exploration had merit, broader goals required having humans in space. Although Earth-orbiting labs were the next step, the panel studied the eventual possibility of observatories on the Moon. The ad hoc panel noted the main rationale for humans in space astronomy was because of the need to assemble, maintain, repair, modify and directly monitor equipment in space and data immediately during specialized operations.
- Born:
  - Abhisit Vejjajiva, English-born Prime Minister of Thailand from 2008 to 2011; as Mark Abhisit Vejjajiva in Wallsend, Northumberland
  - Ralph Knibbs, English rugby union centre for Bristol RFC from 1983 to 1996; in Bristol
  - Lucky Dube, South African reggae musician (d. 2007); as Philip Lucky Dube in Ermelo
- Died: Flannery O'Connor, 39, American novelist, died of lupus.

== August 4, 1964 (Tuesday) ==
- The second Gulf of Tonkin incident, which would propel the United States into a large-scale commitment to the Vietnam War, involved the commanders of two U.S. Navy destroyers believing that they had been victims of an attack that "probably never occurred". The USS C. Turner Joy and the USS Maddox reported during the evening that they were being attacked by North Vietnamese gunboats. U.S. President Lyndon Johnson would authorize a retaliatory air strike from the carrier USS Ticonderoga and deliver a late-night televised address calling Congress to action. Three days later, Congress would overwhelmingly authorize American use of force to a war that would claim the lives of over 58,000 Americans and one million Vietnamese. Nearly 40 years later, declassified information would show that the President was skeptical about the second attack, and the National Security Agency concluded after analyzing 140 formerly secret documents that, although there was no doubt about the August 2 attack on the Maddox, there had never been a second attack. NSA historian Robert J. Hanyok concluded that, "In truth, Hanoi's navy was engaged in nothing that night but the salvage of two of the boats damaged on 2 August. SIGINT reports which suggested that an attack had occurred contained severe analytical errors, unexplained translation changes and the conjunction of two unrelated messages into one translation." The overall consensus is that "there was no attack on the American ships on August 4, but... Johnson believed that there had been an attack when he ordered retaliation."

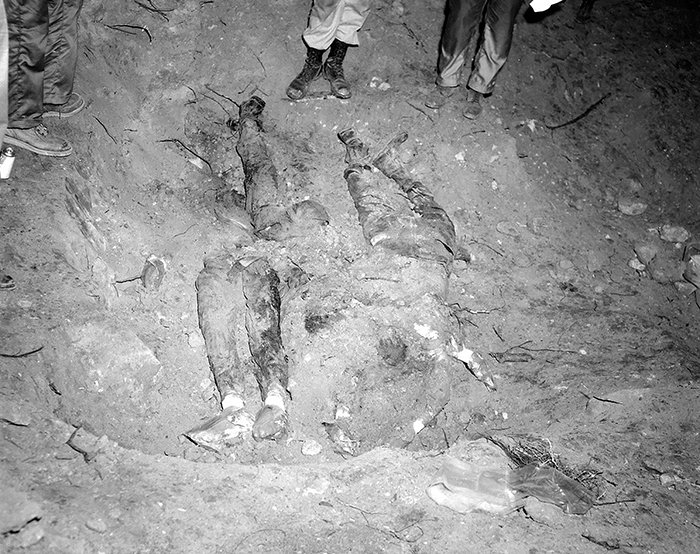
August 4, 1964: The bodies of Schwerner, Goodman and Chaney

- The bodies of murdered civil rights workers Michael Schwerner, Andrew Goodman and James Chaney were found at the site of an earthen dam on a farm near Philadelphia, Mississippi, where they had disappeared on June 21. Acting on a tip from an informer who was motivated by a $30,000 reward, FBI agents obtained a warrant to search the "Old Jolly Farm" with the assistance of road-grading equipment. After six hours, at 2:05 in the afternoon, the searchers "smelled decaying flesh" and began excavating with shovels. Schwerner's body was found 73 minutes later, followed by those of Goodman and Chaney.
- Nine miners in a French limestone quarry were rescued alive after being trapped for eight days by a cave-in near Champagnole. Another five died beneath the surface.

== August 5, 1964 (Wednesday) ==
- U.S. Navy Lieutenant Everett Alvarez Jr. became the first American serviceman to be taken prisoner in North Vietnam, when his A-4 Skyhawk was hit by ground-fire and he parachuted to safety over Hon Gai. Members of the local militia pulled him on to their boat after he landed in the water, and he would be held as a prisoner of war for eight and a half years until February 12, 1973. Alvarez's captivity would be second only to that of U.S. Army Captain Floyd "Jim" Thompson, who had been captured in South Vietnam four months earlier, on March 26.
- The Simbas, the participants in the Simba rebellion, captured Stanleyville, the third largest city in the Democratic Republic of the Congo, and took several hundred Western hostages. Belgian paratroopers, airlifted into Stanleyville by the U.S. Air Force, would retake the city on November 24. During the siege, at least 120 hostages were killed.
- The United States bombed North Vietnam for the first time as it launched Operation Pierce Arrow from the aircraft carriers USS Ticonderoga (CV-14) and USS Constellation (CV-64). The raid, conducted on the North Vietnamese PT boat bases and coastal installations, destroyed 90 percent of the oil storage facilities in the port of Vinh.
- After taking off from the Constellation, U.S. Navy Lieutenant (jg) Richard C. Sather became the first American serviceman to be killed in North Vietnam (though many had died in South Vietnam), when his A-1 Skyraider was hit by anti-aircraft fire, and he crashed into the water off the shore of Thanh Hoa.
- The Vietnam Era began for purposes of federal law pertaining to members of the United States Armed Forces, which defines the period of American involvement in the Vietnam War as "the period beginning on August 5, 1964, and ending on March 27, 1973".
- Born: Adam "MCA" Yauch, American hip hop musician and founder of the Beastie Boys (d. 2012); in Brooklyn

== August 6, 1964 (Thursday) ==
- The first North Vietnamese Air Force jet fighter unit, Fighter Regiment No. 921 (the "Red Star Squadron"), arrived in North Vietnam after training at the Mengzi airfield in the neighboring Yunnan province in the People's Republic of China, bringing 36 MiG-17 and MiG-19 fighters to Phúc Yên Air Base near Hanoi.
- Born: Gary Valenciano, Filipino pop musician and singer; in Santa Mesa, Manila
- Died: Sir Cedric Hardwicke, 71, English stage, film, radio and television actor

== August 7, 1964 (Friday) ==
- By a unanimous (416 to 0) vote in the House of Representatives and an 88 to 2 vote in the Senate, the United States Congress approved the Gulf of Tonkin Resolution, endorsing President Lyndon B. Johnson's broad use of war powers to combat North Vietnamese and local Communist attacks in Vietnam. The approval would clear the way for a massive American commitment to the Vietnam War. The only two votes against the resolution came from Senator Wayne Morse of Oregon and Senator Ernest Gruening of Alaska. U.S. Representative Adam Clayton Powell Jr. of New York did not vote for or against the resolution, and chose to vote "present" during the roll call. The resolution authorized the president to "take all necessary measures to repel any armed attack against the forces of the United States" and "to assist any member" of the Southeast Asia Treaty Organization, but fell short of a declaration of war. The resolution would be repealed by both houses of Congress on June 24, 1970, although American combat operations would continue into 1973.
- On the same day, the People's Republic of China warned that it would "without hesitation... resolutely support the Vietnamese people's just war against U.S. aggressors", though not committing to direct military intervention. American strategy during the war would be set when the Beijing government "informed Washington privately that it would not go beyond material aid provided that the United States did not invade North Vietnam with ground forces", which would be considered a threat to China's frontier.
- The funeral for James Chaney, the first for the three victims of the murder in Neshoba County, Mississippi, was held before African-American mourners at the First Union Baptist Church in Meridian, and one of the eulogies was given by a white preacher, Ed King, the chaplain at Tougaloo College. "I come before you to try to say that my brothers have killed my brothers," he told the gathering. "My white brothers have killed my black brothers." Pastor King, a native of Vicksburg, had fought for civil rights since 1960 and had been frequently jailed and beaten for his activities.
- Born: Carlo Colombara, Italian operatic bass; in Bologna
- Died:
  - Salima Machamba, 89, former Queen of the island of Mohéli in the Comoro Islands until she was deposed in 1909
  - Aleksander Zawadzki, 65, President of Poland since 1952

== August 8, 1964 (Saturday) ==
- The Turkish Air Force began strikes on seven Greek Cypriot towns and villages in Cyprus, as well as other strategic positions on the northwest side of the island republic. The Cyprus government said that 24 Greek Cypriots had been killed, and 200 wounded in the day's attacks. Turkey's government admitted to the strikes, and said that they had happened after efforts to stop Greek Cypriot attacks against the Turkish Cypriot minority had proved to be unsuccessful. Three Turkish Cypriot villages (Ayios Theodhoros, Mansoura and Alvega) were besieged by Greek Cypriots, while the Turks blasted Polis, Xeros, Kokkina, Kato Pyrgos, Ghoudi, Pakhyammos and Pomos. The United Nations Security Council demanded an immediate cease-fire the next day, and attacks halted on August 10. For nearly ten years, there would be no further invasions by either Turkey or Greece, until July 20, 1974, following the overthrow of the Cyprus government by a group favoring union with Greece. Following an invasion by Turkish troops, the island would be divided into Turkish and Greek zones.
- A group of 30 U.S. Navy and U.S. Air Force jet fighters took to the air to confront a wave of MiG fighters from the People's Republic of China, after radar detected a wave of Chinese jets flying south from China's Hainan Island. The F-102 fighters departed from the USAF base at Da Nang while the F-4 and F-8 jets departed from the aircraft carriers Ticonderoga and Constellation, but the Chinese jets stopped short of penetrating South Vietnamese airspace and flew a "holding pattern" over North Vietnam.
- The first protest demonstration against U.S. involvement in the Vietnam War came on the first weekend after U.S. air raids, with about 100 protesters marching near New York's Times Square.
- A Rolling Stones concert in the Netherlands resort of Scheveningen, near The Hague, ended in a near riot after the Stones had played only four songs.
- Born: Jan Josef Liefers, German film and television actor; in Dresden, East Germany
- Died: Josie Hannon Fitzgerald, 98, maternal grandmother of the late John F. Kennedy. She was the first, and remains the only, living grandparent of an incumbent President of the United States. Mrs. Fitzgerald had never been told that her grandson had been assassinated and relatives had kept the news from her for fear that the shock would hasten her death.

== August 9, 1964 (Sunday) ==
- The Coptic Christian church, founded in Egypt by Saint Mark during the same century that the Roman Catholic Church was established by Saint Peter, began a mission under Pope Cyril VI to reach the growing number of adherents in North America, with the ordination of Wagdi Elias as the first Coptic Orthodox priest, and began service in Toronto.
- Addie Davis became the first female Southern Baptist church member to be ordained as a pastor within the conservative American Christian denomination. Mrs. Davis was ordained in Durham, North Carolina at the Watts Street Baptist Church and would be called by the First Baptist Church in Readsboro, Vermont, serving there for eight years.
- The Cuban freighter Maria Teresa was damaged by an explosion while docked at a harbor in Montreal, after arriving in the Canadian city from Cuba. An anti-Castro group, the Cuban Nationalist Association, claimed responsibility for the attack, and said that the bomb had been placed beneath the ship by a frogman working for the C.N.A.
- The All India Muslim Majlis-e-Mushawarat was established by leaders of multiple Islamic organizations in India, under the leadership of Dr. Syed Mahmud, as a political organization to lobby for the interests of the nation's 50 million Muslims.
- Archbishop Makarios III, President of Cyprus, asked Greek Prime Minister George Papandreou for aerial assistance against Turkey. The Greeks responded by sending four planes.
- Born: Brett Hull, Canadian-born National Hockey League right wing, 1990–91 MVP; in Belleville, Ontario, as the son of NHL legend Bobby Hull
- Died: Fontaine Fox, 80, American comic strip artist known for Toonerville Folks, featuring the "Toonerville Trolley"

== August 10, 1964 (Monday) ==
- Associate Justice Hugo L. Black of the United States Supreme Court rejected requests by the Heart of Atlanta Motel and by the Pickrick Restaurant (owned by Lester Maddox in Atlanta) for a temporary stay of enforcement of the Civil Rights Act of 1964 provisions prohibiting racial discrimination in public accommodations. Both the motel and the restaurant had urged that they would suffer irreparable injury (in the form of lost revenues) if they had to serve African-American customers while litigation on the constitutionality of the new law was pending before the Supreme Court, which would not begin its new term until October. In a three-page memorandum, Justice Black wrote that a restraint on enforcement would be unjustifiable, but urged his fellow justices to expedite the cases "in the hope that they could be made ready for final argument the first week we meet in October."
- In the Soviet Union, the number of years of required secondary education was reduced from three years to two years, effectively returning Soviet students to the ten-year school program that had existed prior to 1958. The decree was issued jointly by the Council of Ministers and by the Communist Party's Central Committee prior to the beginning of the 1964–1965 school year.
- Pope Paul VI published his first encyclical, Ecclesiam suam, identifying the Catholic Church with the Body of Christ. Completed on August 6, the papal letter expressed an intent for the church to begin a "dialogue with the other religions of the world", and with anti-religious governments within the Communist nations.
- U.S. President Johnson signed the Gulf of Tonkin Resolution, which took effect as U.S. Public Law 88–408.
- Turkey and Cyprus agreed to the unconditional ceasefire demanded by the United Nations.
- Logan Martin Lake, a reservoir on the Coosa River, Alabama, was completed.

== August 11, 1964 (Tuesday) ==
- In Northern Rhodesia (now Zambia), Alice Lenshina surrendered voluntarily to Zambian authorities "in exchange for a guarantee of her personal safety" but without any promises that she would avoid criminal prosecution. Thousands of Lenshina's followers would be imprisoned or killed during the two months that followed, and another 20,000 would flee to the Democratic Republic of the Congo. Although Lenshina would not be prosecuted, she would remain in detention until her death on December 7, 1978.
- One-hundred and six U.S. Army and U.S. Air Force troops were dispatched to the Democratic Republic of Congo to intervene in the Congolese government's fight against the rebels who had taken control of Stanleyville. The group, sent from Fort Bragg, North Carolina included 40 paratroopers from the Army's 82nd Airborne Division, 56 men from the Air Force maintenance group, and ten Army support personnel, went along with four C-130 transports to be used by the Congo government to airlift its soldiers.
- The U.S. Senate approved the Economic Opportunity Act of 1964, as amended by the House of Representatives, and sent it to the White House for the approval of President Johnson. At the same time as it was approving domestic aid to fight poverty among Americans, the Senate voted 50–35 to cut foreign aid by $216.7 million. On Saturday, the House of Representatives had voted 226 to 185 to amend the Economic Opportunity bill that had passed the Senate on July 23.
- The Beatles' first film, A Hard Day's Night, was released in the United States and Canada by United Artists in 700 movie theaters.

== August 12, 1964 (Wednesday) ==
- Charlie Wilson, who was serving a 30-year sentence for his role in the Great Train Robbery of 1963, escaped from Britain's Winson Green Prison in Birmingham, apparently with the aid of three accomplices. Wilson, who was only four months into his 30-year sentence, was aided by three men believed to have used a rope ladder to scale a 20-foot (6.1 m) high prison wall, tying up a guard, somehow obtaining a key to his cell, and helping him get out. Wilson would be recaptured in Canada in 1968 and would serve 10 years of his sentence. After his release in 1978, he would move to Spain and be murdered in his home in 1990.
- The "Big Three" American automakers (General Motors, Ford and Chrysler) announced through the Automobile Manufacturers Association that they would introduce vehicle emissions control devices voluntarily in time for the 1966 model year. The move came less than two months after California's Motor Vehicle Pollution Control Board had forced the issue by licensing devices by four independent vendors for catalytic converters.
- Sinfonia Sacra, Sir Andrzej Panufnik's Third Symphony, was given its world premiere performance by the Monte Carlo Philharmonic Orchestra in Monaco, conducted by Louis Frémaux. The symphony "gained immense recognition among audiences and critics" and would be performed in concerts worldwide.
- Died:
  - Ian Fleming, 56, former British intelligence officer and novelist who created the "James Bond" series of spy novels, died of a heart attack
  - Dmitry Dmitrievich Maksutov, 68, Soviet optical engineer who invented the Maksutov telescope
  - Ernst Kühnel, 81, German art historian

== August 13, 1964 (Thursday) ==
- Restaurateur Lester Maddox shut down the Pickrick restaurant in Atlanta rather than to evade a judicial order requiring him to serve African-American customers. After reopening it as the Lester Maddox Cafeteria to capitalize on his nationwide fame and to evade the judicial order against the Pickrick, Maddox would close his restaurant permanently on February 5, 1965, following a judgment upholding the August order, and threatening him with a retroactive $200 a day fine (for the 180 days of defying the court). He would parlay his popularity into a political career, winning the election for Governor of Georgia in 1966.
- The New York Yankees baseball team was purchased by the Columbia Broadcasting System, owner of the CBS television and radio networks. CBS paid $11,200,000 for an 80% interest in the team beginning in November, with an option to buy the other 20% within the next five years; by September, 1966, CBS would be the full owner. After eight seasons of mediocrity during the "CBS years" from 1965 through 1972, the television network would sell the team to George Steinbrenner in 1973.
- Murderers Gwynne Owen Evans and Peter Anthony Allen became the last people to be executed in the United Kingdom. Evans was hanged at the Strangways prison in Manchester, and Allen went to the gallows at the Walton Gaol in Liverpool. A year later, the UK would abolish the death penalty. Evans and Allen, aged 24 and 21, respectively, had been dairy workers when they stabbed a laundry truck driver, John Allen West, in the heart during a robbery.
- The U.S. Senate voted, 62 to 28, to bar all aid to Indonesia.
- Born: Jay Buhner, American baseball player; in Louisville, Kentucky
- Died: William H. Davis, 84, American lawyer and government administrator who drafted the National Labor Relations Act, then managed the national economy during World War II and the peacetime transition as Chairman of the War Labor Board and then the Director of Economic Stabilization.

== August 14, 1964 (Friday) ==
- The United Arab Republic (Egypt) entered the war in Yemen with a massive bombing campaign against the royalists led by the Imam Muhammad al-Badr, who had been overthrown in 1962 when the Yemen Arab Republic had been created by coup leaders. Egyptian planes departed from the El Rahaba Airport at the Yemeni capital of Sanaa in an attack on royalist strongholds to reach the Imam's base at Al-Qarah, and Egyptian troops converged on Al-Qarah by moving north from Sanaa and south from Saada, forcing Imam al-Badr to flee for his life; in September 1964, he and the royalists would receive supplies from Saudi Arabia and would mount a counteroffensive.
- The size of the Gemini extravehicular activity (EVA) chest pack was discussed at a meeting between officials of NASA and McDonnell. Attempts to stow the pack on Gemini spacecraft No. 6 showed that it took up room needed for experiments in Gemini missions. NASA requested McDonnell's study of reducing the pack and suggestions for alternative storage. One suggestion was to store some experimental equipment in the capsule's adapter section, but it would mean that a space walk would have to be done before those experiments.
- Muhammad Ali married cocktail waitress Sonji Roi, a month after their first meeting.

== August 15, 1964 (Saturday) ==
- Aloysius Schwartz, a Roman Catholic priest from the United States, founded the Sisters of Mary of Banneux to provide education to impoverished children in Amnam-dong, a poor section of Pusan in South Korea. Over the 50 years that followed, it would establish programs in the Philippines, Honduras, Mexico, Guatemala, and Brazil.
- Construction of the Mount Fuji Radar System, Japan's first early-warning weather radar network, was completed. The project had been commissioned after Isewan Typhoon had killed 5,000 people in September 1959.
- The first rebellion of the Tuareg minority against the government of Mali was declared suppressed by the Malian Army. A new rebellion would not occur until 1990.
- Born: Melinda Gates, American philanthropist, wife of Bill Gates and co-founder of the charitable organization, the Bill & Melinda Gates Foundation; as Melinda Ann French in Dallas

== August 16, 1964 (Sunday) ==
- The U.S. Central Intelligence Agency (CIA) cut all ties with Michael Goleniewski, a former intelligence officer for Poland's spy agency, the Urząd Ochrony Państwa (UOP). Goleniewski, who had provided Polish and Soviet secrets to the CIA since defecting in 1961, had told The New York Times that he was actually Prince Alexei Romanov, the former heir to the Russian throne. Prince Alexei had been killed along with his father, the former Tsar Nicholas II and the rest of the Romanov family in 1918. Goleniewski, who had been born four years after Alexei's death at the age of 13, claimed also that he was the sole Romanov survivor and heir to the Romanov fortune.
- The New York Times published "Visit to the World's Fair of 2014", by American author and scientist Isaac Asimov, his forecast of the world of fifty years in the future. Fifty years later, a writer would note, "Depending on which parts are emphasized, Asimov's predictions range from off-the-wall (underwater cities and solar power plants in space) to eerily prescient (miniaturized computers, self-driving cars and automated kitchen appliances). He estimated the U.S. population at 350 million (it's just under 319 million), and the world population at 6.5 billion (it's 7.2 billion) -- not bad, considering in 1964 they were 192 million and 3.3 billion, respectively."
- South Vietnam's Prime Minister, Major General Nguyen Khanh, was named as the nation's new President after a coup d'état, replacing figurehead chief of state Duong Van Minh. Under a new constitution, drafted with the assistance of the U.S. Embassy, a 62-member revolutionary council had the right to veto Khanh's decisions. Khanh would resign after only nine days, and replaced by a three-man military junta. On September 30, Khanh was named prime minister, served only 30 days.
- A bus accident killed 14 children and three adults from the Arras region of northern France, when the vehicle plunged into a ravine near Bourg St. Maurice. The dead were part of an excursion of 55 children who were attending a summer camp in the French Alps, and the bus was on a narrow road near the Little St. Bernard mountain pass. An oncoming car forced the bus to the side of the road, which then crumbled under the bus's weight, causing the accident.
- Martin-Baltimore received the propellant tanks for Gemini launch vehicle 6 from Martin-Denver, which had begun fabricating them in April 1964. After being inspected, the tanks were placed in storage where they remained until December 18.

== August 17, 1964 (Monday) ==
- Construction was completed on the Capital Beltway, a 64-mile (103 km) multi-lane interstate highway that surrounds the District of Columbia and passes through Maryland and Virginia as I-495. The first section of the route, originally called the "Washington Circumferential Highway", had been opened in Maryland in 1957 as one of the first projects in the American Interstate Highway System; the project cost an estimated $189,000,000 at the time.
- A year and a half after the Konfrontasi between Indonesia and Malaysia began on the island of Borneo, about 100 Indonesian Army troops landed on the Malaysian mainland, launching an amphibious invasion on the peninsula at Pontian. A historian notes that the troops (and a force of paratroopers) "expected to be welcomed by the people" but were immediately turned over to the national government by local militias.

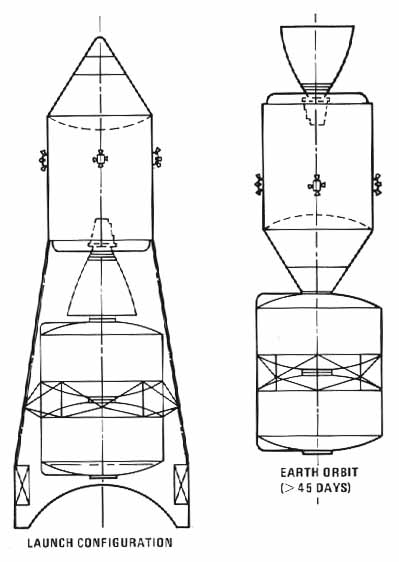
Proposed Apollo "X" spacecraft in launch and Earth-orbit configurations

- MSC's Spacecraft Integration Branch proposed an Apollo "X" spacecraft to be used in Earth orbit for biomedical and scientific missions of extended duration. Under the plan, the lunar Apollo spacecraft and its systems would be modified minimally with redundancies and spares. The MSC suggested a first-phase mission of the Apollo "X" craft as a two-person Earth-orbiting laboratory for a period of 14 to 45 days, to be boosted into a 370-kilometre (230 mi) Earth orbit by a Saturn IB rocket. Various configurations considered were Configuration A (a two-person crew, a 14 to 45 day mission, and no lab module; Configuration B, a three-person, 45-day mission with a single lab module; Configuration C, a three-person 45-day mission with a double lab module; and Configuration D, a three-person, 120-day mission, with an independent systems lab module.
- A severe electrical storm near NASA's complex 19 interrupted testing of Gemini launch vehicle (GLV) 2. Several observers reported a lightning strike at or near complex 19. All testing was halted for a thorough investigation of this so-called electromagnetic incident.
- Died: Keiji Sada, 37, Japanese actor was killed in a car accident

== August 18, 1964 (Tuesday) ==
- At the Wartburg Castle in Eisenach in East Germany, Socialist Unity Party Chairman Walter Ulbricht met with Moritz Mitzenheim, the Evangelical Lutheran Bishop of Thuringia, and the two signed a "document on church-state understanding". Although Bishop Mitzenheim was not authorized to speak on behalf of all of East Germany's Protestant churches, there were concessions made, with the East German evangelical Lutherans associating less with the West German church, and East Germany allowing pacifists an alternative form of military service that did not require them to bear arms.
- The U.S. Senate voted, 44 to 41, to table a bill that would have required equal television and radio time to Lyndon Johnson and Barry Goldwater in the presidential campaign if the two candidates did not participate in a debate. All 44 of the votes for postponing consideration of the legislation were from Democratic Party senators; 12 other Democrats joined all 29 Republican senators in opposing the move.
- The International Olympic Committee banned South Africa from future participation in the Olympic Games after the nation's white-minority government declined to disassociate itself from its apartheid policy of barring non-whites from its Olympic team. Frank Braun, President of the South African Olympic Committee, had informed the IOC that it did not intend to change its policies.
- In The Ashes, the five-match test cricket series between Australia and England, Australia retained its title despite having won only one of the matches, and despite the consensus that the English team was the better of the two. The other four meetings ended in draws, including the final match, which was ruined by the weather, giving Australia the 1–0 victory for the series.
- Lebanon's Parliament voted, 99 to 5, to elect Education Minister Charles Helou as the nation's new President. Helou would take office on September 23.
- Died: Hildegard Trabant, 37, was shot by East German border guards while attempting to cross into West Berlin. Unlike almost all other deaths at the Berlin Wall, Trabant's killing would go unnoticed in the West until the discovery of the incident 26 years later in East German files in 1990.

== August 19, 1964 (Wednesday) ==
- The United States launched the world's first geostationary satellite, sending Syncom 3 into orbit in advance of the Summer Olympics in Tokyo, with a dual purpose of televising the games back to the U.S. and to provide "an emergency communication link with hard-to-reach Asian trouble spots". The next day, a ground station in ground control at Salisbury, South Australia sent a command to fire rockets to increase Syncom 3's altitude from 695 miles (1,118 km) to 22,245 miles (35,800 km) above the equator, where it would match the Earth's rotation. Over a period of two weeks, other ground stations would send commands at precise times to gradually move Syncom 3 to a position "above the intersection of the equator and the International Date Line."
- Born: Dermott Brereton, Australian Football League star; in Dublin
- Died: Hans Peter Luhn, 68, German computer scientist who invented the Luhn algorithm and the Key Word in Context (KWIC) search system, as well as developing the Selective dissemination of information (SDI) concept.

== August 20, 1964 (Thursday) ==
- U.S. President Lyndon Johnson signed the Economic Opportunity Act into law. "Today, for the first time in all the history of the human race," Johnson said in a ceremony at the Rose Garden outside the White House, "a great nation is able to make and is willing to make a commitment to eradicate poverty among its people. To sign the legislation, Johnson "used 72 pens, which he handed out to the notables who were gathered together... a moment of high drama in a period in which a number of new, important, controversial programs were infused into American life", with the War on Poverty being a major part of Johnson's Great Society program.
- Intelsat, the International Telecommunications Satellite Organization, was established by 11 founding nations.
- The U.S. Air Force began the first of 3,435 unmanned drone reconnaissance missions during the Vietnam War, using the Ryan AQM-34 Lightning Bug series. The first of the Lightning Bugs flew a mission in Communist Chinese airspace, while others flew over locations in Southeast Asia. The drones could gather photographic, electronic, and communication intelligence, as well as to serve as decoys or to drop leaflets.
- What would later become known as "The Harmonica Incident" took place between New York Yankees' manager Yogi Berra and utility infielder Phil Linz after Linz's playing of a harmonica on the team bus following a four-game sweep by the Chicago White Sox.

== August 21, 1964 (Friday) ==
- U.S. Navy Lieutenant Charles Klusmann, who had been held captive by the communist Pathet Lao since June 6 after his RF-8A Crusader jet was shot down over Laos, managed to escape his captors after he and five Laotian and Thai prisoners of war were able to tunnel under the wall of the compound and sneak past sentries. He and one of the five POWs were able to reach safety at Bouam Long. Lt. Klusmann would be one of only two U.S. Navy aviators to escape prison during the Vietnam War.
- Born: Gary Elkerton, Australian surfer nicknamed "Kong"; three time world masters champion (2000, 2001 and 2003); in Ballina, New South Wales
- Died: Palmiro Togliatti, 71, Italian politician and General Secretary of the Italian Communist party (PCI), died while vacationing in the Soviet Union at the Black Sea resort of Yalta. Togliatti, who had led the largest Communist Party in Western Europe since 1926, and been in poor health since being shot four times in a 1948 assassination attempt. Togliatti was succeeded as PCI secretary by Luigi Longo.

== August 22, 1964 (Saturday) ==
- Match of the Day, one of the longest-running shows on British television, premiered on BBC 2 with Kenneth Wolstenholme as its presenter. Each Saturday during the English soccer football season, the show would feature pre-recorded highlights of one of the day's games. Wolstenholme introduced the first broadcast, featuring Liverpool hosting Arsenal at Anfield stadium, with the words, "Welcome to Match of the Day, the first of a weekly series on BBC2. This afternoon we are in Beatleville." Liverpool won the match, 3–2.
- Manned Spacecraft Center (MSC) Procurement and Contracts Division contracted with the David Clark Company for modifying the Gemini flight suit, including the G3C and G4C suits, and related equipment for the Gemini 3 mission. The first four Gemini flight suits for the crew and the backup crew of Gemini 3, were delivered to MSC days later.
- NASA's Crew Systems Division formally notified AiResearch to begin immediately integrating displays and associated circuitry for the astronaut Modular Maneuvering Unit (MMU) into the basic design of the extravehicular life support system (ELSS) for the Gemini 9 mission for as U.S. Department of Defense experiment D-12, with a delivery of a prototype within four months.
- Hurricane Cleo began a five-day path of destruction through the Caribbean Sea, destroying homes and killing 120 people in Haiti and Guadeloupe on its first day. It then swept northward to Florida, where it caused an additional $200 million in damage and killed 13 more people; the final death toll was 156 lives lost.
- Fannie Lou Hamer, civil rights activist and Vice Chair of the Mississippi Freedom Democratic Party, addressed the Credentials Committee of the 1964 Democratic National Convention, challenging the all-white Mississippi delegation.
- The Beatles appeared in Canada for the first time, performing in Vancouver at Empire Stadium.
- Born:
  - Mats Wilander, Swedish tennis player and winner of seven Grand Slam singles events; in Växjö
  - Diane Setterfield, British novelist; in Englefield, Berkshire
  - Maria Koc, Polish politician; in Prudnik
- Died:
  - Benjamin J. Davis Jr., 60, African-American politician and Communist who served on the New York City Council from 1943 to 1949. Smith, who was editor of the Communist Party USA newspaper, the Daily Worker, was jailed for three years in a federal penitentiary for violating the Smith Act by being a member of a subversive organization.
  - Bishop Symeon Lukach, 71, Soviet cleric jailed seven years for unauthorized evangelism in the Ukrainian Greek Catholic Church; of tuberculosis shortly after his release from a labor camp.

== August 23, 1964 (Sunday) ==
- Layla Balabakki, a Lebanese Shi'ite Muslim, feminist, journalist and bestselling author, was exonerated from obscenity charges arising from her collection of short stories, Safinat hanan ila al-quamar (The Spaceship of Tenderness to the Moon). Charges against her were dropped and the copies of the book (which had been confiscated by police from all bookstores in Beirut) were returned to their owners.
- Abraham and Isaac, an orchestral ballad composed by Igor Stravinsky, was performed for the public for the first time, with a concert at the Binyanei HaUmmah in Jerusalem. Stravinsky, who had composed the work on commission from the Israel Festival Committee, wrote the original lyrics in Hebrew.
- The Beatles performed at the Hollywood Bowl in Los Angeles, California, one of the two concerts were compiled as the 1977 live album The Beatles at the Hollywood Bowl.
- Born: Kong Hee, Singaporean pastor and founder of the City Harvest Church who was later convicted for the embezzlement of $50 million (USD) of church funds and the subsequent coverup
- Died: Estella Canziani, 87, British travel writer, folklorist and painter

== August 24, 1964 (Monday) ==
- The Tridentine Mass of the Catholic Church was celebrated in the English language for the first time, as permitted by a decision from the Second Vatican Council allowing religious services in the vernacular, or native, languages rather than in Latin. Reverend Frederick R. McManus of the Catholic University of America celebrated the mass in front of 11,000 people at the Kiel Auditorium in St. Louis, Missouri at the National Liturgical Week conference, in advance of the November 29 services where the vernacular would be permitted worldwide. Father McManus opened the service with the words, "Lord, have mercy" in place of the traditional Greek prayer "Kyrie eleison", and the congregation responded, "Christ, have mercy" instead of Christe eleison.
- The explosion of fireworks near two tanks of butane gas killed 37 people in the Mexican village of Atlatlahucan in Morelos state. The fireworks had been gathered for an upcoming festival on September 21 for the town's patron saint, Matthew the Apostle.
- Born: Salizhan Sharipov, Uzbek Kyrgyzstani space traveler who served as an astronaut and mission specialist on the American Space Shuttle Endeavour in 1998, and as a cosmonaut and flight engineer on the Russian Soyuz TMA-5 from 2004 to 2005; in Özgön, Uzbek SSR, Soviet Union (now Uzbekistan)
- Died: Umberto D'Ancona, 68, Italian biologist

== August 25, 1964 (Tuesday) ==
- Nguyen Khanh resigned after only nine days as President of South Vietnam. Only three days into his term, students across the southeast Asian nation had rioted in protest of his assumption of a dictatorship. The generals on the military revolutionary council temporarily replaced the presidency with a triumvirate composed of Khanh, Duong Van Minh and Tran Thien Khiem.
- Born: Maxim Kontsevich, Russian-born French mathematician; in Khimki, Russian SFSR, Soviet Union

== August 26, 1964 (Wednesday) ==
- Incumbent U.S. President Lyndon Johnson received the Democratic Party nomination for President, by acclamation, at the national party convention in Atlantic City, New Jersey. Earlier in the day, President Johnson took the unprecedented action of personally appearing before the delegates to urge delegates to endorse his choice for a running mate, U.S. Senator Hubert H. Humphrey of Minnesota. In the past, party nominees would not come to the national convention until the evening of giving a speech accepting the nomination.
- The Cabinet Crisis of 1964 in Malawi began in the West African nation's third month of existence, when three of the most prominent members of the cabinet (Foreign Minister Kanyama Chiume, Home Affairs Minister Yatuta Chisiza and Justice Minister Orton Chirwa) confronted Prime Minister Hastings Kamuzu Banda and angrily criticized his leadership abilities. Shaken, Banda at first offered to resign; on September 8, he angrily began reprisals by dismissing most of his cabinet and assuming dictatorial powers.
- The white-minority government of Rhodesia outlawed the two main black African resistance parties, the Zimbabwe African People's Union (ZAPU) and the Zimbabwe African National Union (ZANU), and arrested their leaders, including future Prime Minister and President Robert Mugabe of the ZAPU.
- Born:
  - Carsten Wolf, East German racing cyclist, 1989 world champion in the 4000m pursuit; in Potsdam
  - Bobby Jurasin, American-born Canadian Football League star and 2006 inductee to the Canadian Football Hall of Fame; in Wakefield, Michigan

== August 27, 1964 (Thursday) ==
- Walt Disney's hit film Mary Poppins, starring Julie Andrews in the title role and Dick Van Dyke, made its first appearance, with a première at Grauman's Chinese Theatre in Hollywood, California. The film would go on to become Disney's biggest moneymaker, and would win five Academy Awards, including an Academy Award for Best Actress for Andrews.

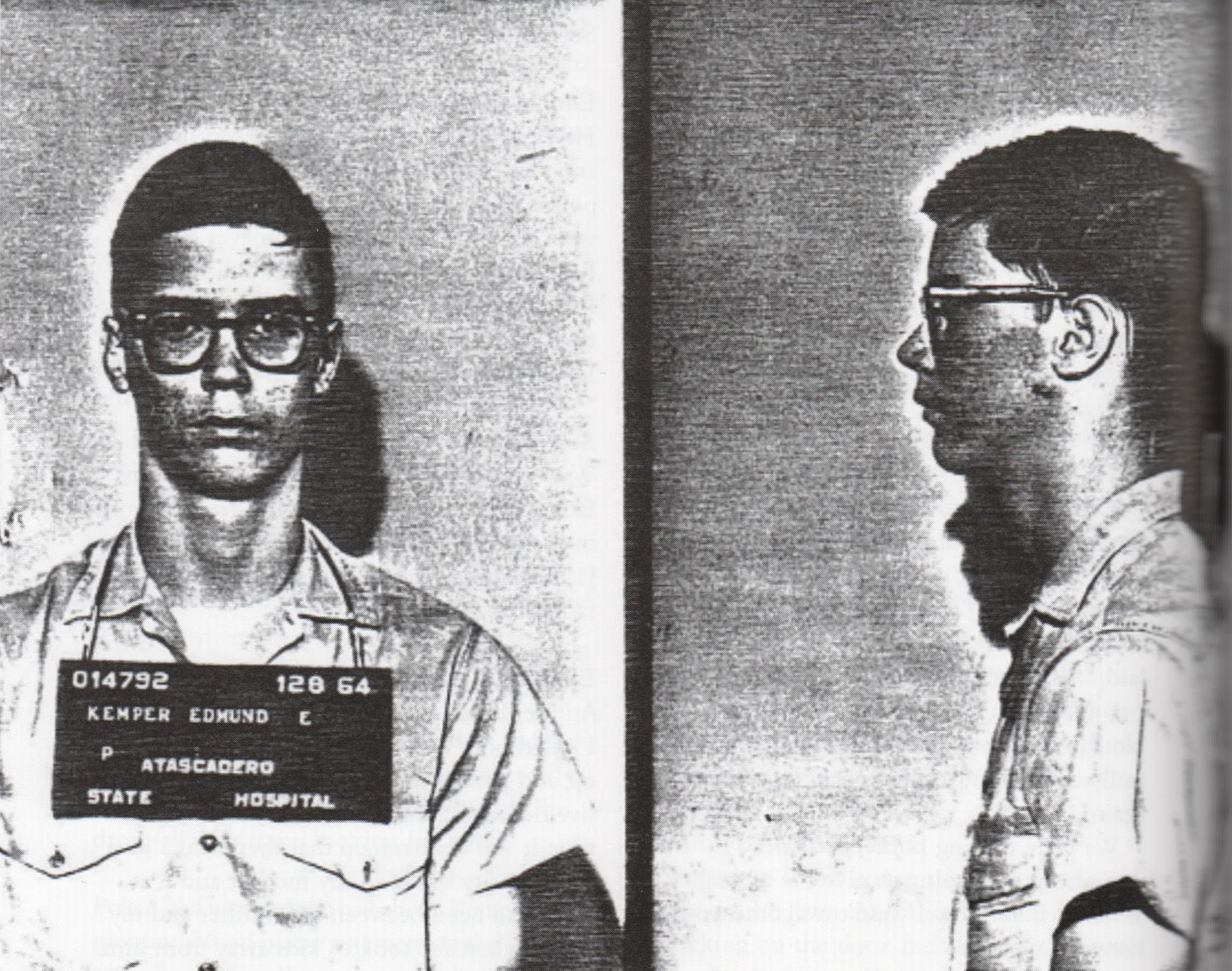
Edmund Kemper's 1964 mugshot

- At the age of 15, the would-be serial killer Edmund Kemper shot and killed his grandmother in the head and neck with his hunting rifle after having an argument in the kitchen. He then shot his grandfather in the driveway after he returned from grocery shopping. Unsure of what to do next, he phoned his mother, who told him to contact the local police. Kemper did so and waited to be taken into custody.
- The Democratic Republic of the Congo announced that its troops had recaptured the city of Albertville from rebels who had held it for two months. Stanleyville, however, still remained under rebel control. Congolese troops under the command of Colonel Kikuji retook the city (now called Kalemie) from mercenaries led by Mike Hoare, and freed 135 Western hostages who had been captured during the Simba rebellion.
- President Johnson accepted the Democratic Party nomination on his 56th birthday. Johnson, who had become President of the United States the previous November 22 after the assassination of John F. Kennedy, invoked the late President's name and told delegates, "Let us here rededicate ourselves to keeping burning the golden torch of promise which John Kennedy set aflame!"
- With the opening of the Tsukuda Bridge over Japan's Sumida River, the residents of the island of Tsukishima were able to drive to neighboring Tokyo for the first time, and the ferryboat that had serviced the residents for years made its last run.
- In South Vietnam, troops of the Army of the Republic of Viet Nam (ARVN) opened fire on a crowd of 3,000 unarmed Roman Catholic demonstrators who were protesting outside of the national military headquarters.
- Troops from the People's Republic of China crossed the border from Tibet into the neighboring Buddhist kingdom of Sikkim, invading through the Himalayan Mountains pass at Nathu La in the first of numerous incursions.
- Hurricane Cleo struck the Cape Kennedy area. Stage II of Gemini launch vehicle (GLV) 2 was deerected and stored; the erector was lowered to horizontal, and stage I was lashed in its vertical position. Stage II was reerected September 1. When forecasts indicated that Hurricane Dora would strike Cape Kennedy, both stages of GLV-2 were deerected on September 8 and secured in the Missile Assembly Building. Hurricane Ethel subsequently threatened the area, and both stages remained in the hangar until September 14, when they were returned to complex 19 and reerected.
- Born:
  - Nicolas Bochatay, Swiss Olympic speed skier who was killed during the 1992 Winter Olympics when he was struck by a snow grooming machine; in the Canton of Valais (d. 1992)
  - Paul Bernardo, Canadian serial killer and rapist; in Scarborough, Ontario
- Died:
  - Gracie Allen, 69 (age was officially given as 62), American actress and comedian who teamed with her husband, George Burns, in The Burns and Allen Show, died of a heart attack.
  - Aleksey Zhivotov, 59, Soviet Russian composer

== August 28, 1964 (Friday) ==
- The United States launched the weather satellite Nimbus 1, the first man-made object to be placed into a near-polar Sun-synchronous orbit around the Earth. Traveling in an elliptical orbit 263 miles (423 km), Nimbus 1 was always above an area of the globe during a period of maximum sunlight, which allowed almost full coverage of the planet and powered the satellite's 10,500 solar cells. The satellite would go out of commission 26 days later, due to a malfunction of its solar panels, but managed to transmit 27,000 images during the 1964 Atlantic hurricane season, including Hurricane Dora and Hurricane Gladys.
- The Soviet Union launched its first weather satellite, Meteor 1, but the payload was not able to orient itself properly to transmit any useful images back to Earth.
- A race riot in Philadelphia began after tensions between African American residents and the city police escalated. During the two nights of violence, two people would be killed, 339 injured, and 774 arrested. The triggering incident happened when two city policemen, one black and one white, had attempted to move an automobile that was blocking an intersection. When the owner's wife, an African-American, confronted them and was arrested, bystanders began attacking the two police men.
- After pressure from the United States, Japan's Prime Minister Hayato Ikeda announced that American nuclear submarines would be welcome in Japanese ports, though only if they were equipped with conventional weapons rather than nuclear weapons.
- The Beatles performed the first of two weekend stadium concerts at Forest Hills, New York, outside of New York City. All 15,983 tickets were sold out. On the same day, Bob Dylan introduced The Beatles to marijuana during their first tour of the United States, in a meeting between the legendary artists at the Delmonico Hotel in New York City.

== August 29, 1964 (Saturday) ==
- The government of the Soviet Union adopted a resolution favorable to the Soviet German minority, rescinding Joseph Stalin's order of August 28, 1941, directing the repression of ethnic Germans. "Although this resolution meant little in terms of every day life for Germans," an author notes, it did prompt a delegation of the German minority to (unsuccessfully) seek a restoration of the Volga German Autonomous Soviet Socialist Republic that had existed from 1918 to 1941.
- Nguyen Xuan Oanh was appointed as Prime Minister of South Vietnam and charged with forming a caretaker government until domestic unrest and rioting could be brought under control. Oanh had been a professor at Trinity College in Hartford, Connecticut, from 1955 to 1960, where he was nicknamed "Jack Owen" by the students.
- Vishva Hindu Parishad (VHP), Hindu religious and political organization, was founded in India at a conference of 150 religious leaders in Bombay. Among its objectives was to establish unity among the several denominations within the Hindu faith, with an aim of creating a pure Hindu ethnostate.
- The Tony Award-winning Broadway play A Funny Thing Happened on the Way to the Forum, a musical with lyrics and music by Stephen Sondheim and inspired by the 3rd century BC playwright Plautus, closed its run after 964 performances.
- Born: Pasteur Ntoumi, Republic of the Congo clergyman, warlord and politician; in Brazzaville

== August 30, 1964 (Sunday) ==
- The private Population Reference Bureau announced that at the current birthrate in the United States, there would be 362 million people in the United States by the year 2000 and 437 million by the year 2010. "Thus, only 50 years hence," the report said, "the population increase for a single decade might be 75 million people. That is equal to the entire population of the United States in 1900." The actual U.S. population in 2000 would be 281 million and the 2010 population would be almost 309 million, an increase of 28 million people.
- The Chinese Communist Party's Central Committee sent an angry reply to a July 30 proposal from the Soviet Communist Party for a meeting to resolve their differences, claiming that the letter had "slammed the door tight" against any prospect of a meeting.
- The first Clásico Joven match between two Mexico City football clubs, Club América and Cruz Azul, took place, with Club América winning 2–1. Martín Ibarreche and Alfonso Portugal scored for Club América, and Hilario Díaz for Cruz Azul.
- Born: Barbara F. Walter, American political scientist; in Bronxville, New York

== August 31, 1964 (Monday) ==
- U.S. President Johnson signed legislation creating a permanent, nationwide food stamp program for impoverished Americans. Under the original guidelines, qualifying families could purchase $10 of food stamps for $6 of cash, a system whereby the federal government would pay for 40% of specific food purchases.
- Schools in Biloxi, Mississippi, were integrated for the first time as 16 black first grade students were enrolled, without incident, in the four elementary schools that had previously been all-white (Lopez, Gorenflo, Dukate, and Jefferson Davis Elementary). The 12 girls and four boys had been registered pursuant to a U.S. District Court order, and were protected from protesters by 20 U.S. Marshals supplementing local law enforcement officials. An "emergency force" of 1,800 members of the Mississippi National Guard was on standby in the event that "federalization" needed to be ordered by President Johnson. The next day, state and federal officers protected Debra Lewis as the lone African-American to enroll in a white school in Leake County. On the other hand, 39 black first graders would peacefully be enrolled in the eight all-white schools in Jackson on September 14 as "history was made—most uneventfully".
- Syria created its 13th administrative province, the Quneitra Governorate, from portions of the Rif Dimashq and Daraa governorates, in order to unify the area around the Golan Heights. Israel would capture most of the Quneitra province less than three years later during the Six-Day War.
- Died: Peter Lanyon, 46, English painter, was killed in a glider crash.
