= Eric Ridder =

American sailor

Medal record

Sailing

Representing the United States

Olympic Games
Gold medal – first place	1952 Helsinki	6 m class

Eric Ridder (July 1, 1918 – July 23, 1996) was an American sailor and Olympic champion. He was born in Hewlett, New York, and died in Locust Valley, New York.

He competed at the 1952 Summer Olympics in Helsinki, where he won a gold medal in the 6 metre class with the boat Llanoria.

Ridder was also the winning skipper in the 1964 America's Cup, guiding the New York Yacht Club's 12-metre yacht, the Constellation, to a 4-0 sweep over Sovereign of the Royal Thames Yacht Club.

He graduated from Harvard University in 1940.
