= 1964 America's Cup =

19th America's Cup
Defender United States
- Defender club: New York Yacht Club
- Yacht: Constellation

Challenger United Kingdom
- Challenger club: Royal Thames Yacht Club
- Yacht: Sovereign

Competition
- Location: Newport, Rhode Island, United States
- Dates: September 1964
- Rule: 12-metre
- Winner: New York Yacht Club
- Score: 4–0

The 19th America's Cup was held in September 1964, in the Block Island Sound off Newport, Rhode Island. It would be the third race following the 20 year pause for World War 2, and the switch from the J Class to the 12 Metre rule.

Following Royal Sydney Yacht Squadron's unsuccessful challenge in 1962, Lord Mountbatten, then Commodore of the Royal Thames Yacht Club (RTYC), quickly submitted a challenge for the following year. As only a month had lapsed since their defense, NYYC respectfully declined, claiming the need of a full year to recover prior to entertaining another challenge. NYYC accepted RTYC's challenge in 1963, establishing the next race series to be a first to four out of seven races between 16-27 September 1964.

British industrialist J. Anthony Boyden headed RTYC's challenge, with the David Boyd designed Sovereign. Sovereign had beaten her sister ship Kurrewa V to become the challenger. Eric Ridder headed NYYC's defense with the Olin Stephens designed Constellation. Constellation had beaten American Eagle, Easterner, Nefertiti, and the 1958 defender Columbia to become the defender.

1964 would signal the growing shift away from a friendly race between gentleman sailors to the introduction of increasingly professional syndicates spending significant sums developing crews and training for years in advance of the race. Both Constellation, backed by Walter Gubelmann and Harold Stirling Vanderbilt, and American Eagle, backed by Pierre Samuel "Pete" du Pont IV, reportedly spent US$600,000 (equivalent to $6,228,500 in 2025) each on their campaigns, while Boyden spent in excess of £300,000 (equivalent to £5,312,800 in 2025) on Sovereign's challenge.

Sovereign's failed challenge would end up being Royal Thames Yacht Club's final attempt as an America's Cup challenger of record, and it would take the United Kingdom 60 years until Royal Yacht Squadron would become a challenger again in 2024.

== Races ==
The 1964 course changed from the previous races at the mouth of Narragansett Bay off Newport to a single six leg Olympic course rather than two alternating courses of the two-leg windward-leeward, twice-around, or a three-leg triangular course from past years, determined to place a greater emphasis on boat and sail handling.

The start of the race would be the traditional start at a buoy placed nine miles SSE of the Brenton Reef Light, beat windward 4.5 miles, complete an isosceles triangle of two 3.5 mile legs reaching back to the start, beating back windward 4.5 miles, running back 4.5 miles, then beating back up 4.5 to the finish for a 24.3 mile course with 13.5 miles of beating, 6.3 miles of reaching, and 4.5 miles of running. The time limit would be 6 hours to complete, and sophisticated electronic navigation devices such as LORAN or Decca would be prohibited. Additionally, a yacht with right-of-way will not be required to avoid a collision, preventing the give-way captain from gambling on a crossing situation.

The U.S. defender, Constellation, skippered by Bob Bavier, defeated Sovereign, skippered by Peter Scott, in a four-race sweep.

Date	New York Yacht Club	Time (h/m/s)	Royal Thames Yacht Club	Time (h/m/s)	Score	Delta
16 September	Constellation	3:30:33	Sovereign	3:36:05	1-0	5:32
17 September	Constellation	3:46:27	Sovereign	4:06:49	2-0	20:22
19 September	Constellation	3:38:04	Sovereign	3:43:57	3-0	5:53
21 September	Constellation	4:12:16	Sovereign	4:28:05	4-0	15:49
