= Constellation (1964 yacht) =

American racing yacht

- Yacht club: New York Yacht Club
- Nation: United States
- Class: 12-metre
- Sail no: US–20
- Designer(s): Olin Stephens
- Builder: Minneford’s Yacht Yard Inc.
- Launched: 1964
- Owner(s): Eric Ridder syndicate

Racing career
- Skippers: Eric Ridder and Bob Bavier
- Notable victories: 1964 America's Cup
- America's Cup: 1964 America's Cup
- AC Defender Selection Series: 1964 America's Cup Defender Selections Series

Specifications
- Length: 20.82 m (68.3 ft) (LOA); 14.05 m (46.1 ft) (LWL)
- Beam: 3.66 m (12.0 ft)
- Sail area: 170 m^{2} (1,800 sq ft)

Constellation is an American 12-metre class racing yacht that successfully defended the 1964 America's Cup.

On 20 September 1964, Constellation completed a 4–0 victory over Sovereign in the 1964 America's Cup.
