= Sovereign (yacht) =

Yacht

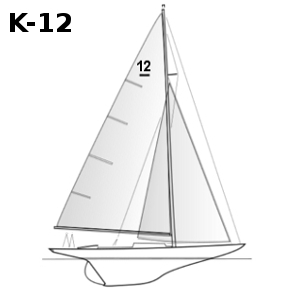
- Sovereign line drawing
- Yacht club: Royal Thames Yacht Club
- Nation: United Kingdom
- Class: 12-metre
- Sail no: K–12
- Designer(s): David Boyd
- Builder: Alexander Robertson & Sons
- Owner(s): J. Anthony Boyden

Racing career
- Skippers: Peter Scott
- America's Cup: 1964 America's Cup

Specifications
- Type: Monohull
- Displacement: 28.38 t
- Length: 21.08 m (69 ft 2 in)
- Beam: 3.81 m (12 ft 6 in)
- Draft: 2.71 m (8 ft 11 in)
- Sail area: 175 m^{2} (1,880 sq ft)
- Crew: 11

Sovereign (sail number K-12) was the unsuccessful challenger of record for the 1964 America's Cup. She beat out sister ship Kurrewa V in trials to represent the Royal Thames Yacht Club in their final attempt to recapture the Cup.

== Design ==
Initially designed by David Boyd and built by Alexander Robertson & Sons, Sovereign was built to the 12 Metre rule, specifically for the 1964 America's Cup challenge. Boyd had apprenticed under noted naval architect William Fife, who had designed several America's Cup challengers for Sir Thomas Lipton under the J-Class and Universal rule that dictated races prior to 1958, as well several 12 Metre Olympics medallists. Boyd was seen as Fife's successor in British yachting circles, and second only to the American designer Olin Stephens, whose designs dominated the defending sydicates of the 12 Metre era.

She was the second 12-metre yacht to be built at Alexander Robertson & Sons where Boyd was managing director. Boyd had also designed Sceptre, the unsuccessful 1958 challenger. A change in the rules for the race agreed to at the time of challenge required that any challenging boat be entirely built and outfitted by the challenging country, disqualifying the use of Ted Hood's popular sails, as allowed in previous challenges. Ratsey and Lapthorn and the then still new as a sailmaker, Bruce Banks, provided the sail, and Banks also served as sailing master and tactician.

While Boyd's designs were unquestionablly aesthetically pleasing, British sailing technology was beginning to lag behind in 1958, with American technological advances in rig, sails, and hardware far outpacing the British by 1964. There was concern that early tank testing at Stevens Institute of Technology in New Jersey might disqualify the design, which was also prohibited in the new rules, but ruled to be exempt as the testing predated the adoption of the rule.

Her hull is identical to the later built Kurrewa V, whose design was released by owner Boyden to fellow RTYC members, Frank and John Livingston, as a sparring partner. However, Sovereign's keel is wedge shaped while Kurrewa's is rounded. For the cup trials and challenge, her hull was painted dark blue with a slipped Tudor rose painted on her bows and on her flat reversed transom.

== Career ==
Following Gretel's unsuccessful challenge in 1962, Lord Mountbatten, then Commodore of the RTYC, quickly submitted a challenge for the following year. As only a month had lapsed since Weatherly's defense, NYYC respectfully declined, claiming the need of a full year to recover prior to entertaining another challenge.

RTYC member and industrialist J. Anthony Boyden established RTYC's next syndicate, and issued another challenge in 1963 to race in 1964. Boyden bought the Laurent Giles designed, Fife built, 12 metre Flica II, from Sceptre owner Hugh Goodson, who had used Flicka as a trial boat against Sceptre. Boyd used Flicka to train his crews while he commissioned Spectre designer David Boyd to build a new challenger, reportedly spending an estimated £300,000 GBP (£7.7M GBP today) on the campaign.

Sovereign lost 4–0 to defender Constellation of the New York Yacht Club. Although she beat her trial competitor Kurrewa V with a narrow 12-11 advantage, Sovereign's more disciplined team was thought to have an advantage for the Cup challenge, but her technological deficiencies proved too great.

== Legacy ==
Sovereign was the last yacht to represent the United Kingdom in general and Royal Thames Yacht Club in particular as a challenger of record until Royal Yacht Squadron's challenge in 2024. Many members at that time thought that for a club that was founded in 1775 and participated in America's Cup since 1870 to withdraw from the tournament completely was an embarrassment. The boatyard that built the yacht was sold by the Robertson family, who owned it since its foundation in 1876, one year after the race, essentially ending wooden boatbuilding there.

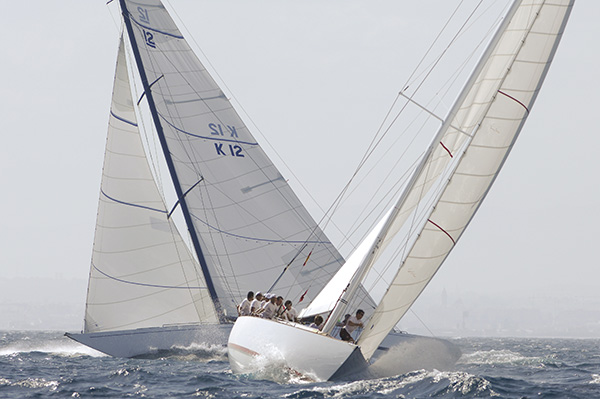
Sovereign (behind) and Ikra, c.2008

French ballpoint pen manufacturer Marcel Bich, in an attempt to kick start a French challenge, purchased both Sovereign and Kurrewa, as well as Constellation, to train French crews to compete at the professional level starting to be seen in the late 1960s. With a sydicate given an open book to outfit even the training boats with the best technology, Boyd would be vindicated in the accusations that his designs were at fault. Sovereign and Kurrewa would routinely beat Constellation in trials conducted in the Bay of Quiberon with equal quality rig and sails for all boats, and where conditions were similar to those found off Newport, Rhode Island.

Sovereign survives today under private ownership and was last homeported at the Yacht Club de Cannes, where she continues to participate in classic yacht regattas, including against her sister Kurrewa, since renamed Ikra (as seen in photo to right).

== See also ==
- 1964 America's Cup
- Alexander Robertson & Sons
- Constellation
