= Waterman Wash =

Stream in Maricopa County, Arizona

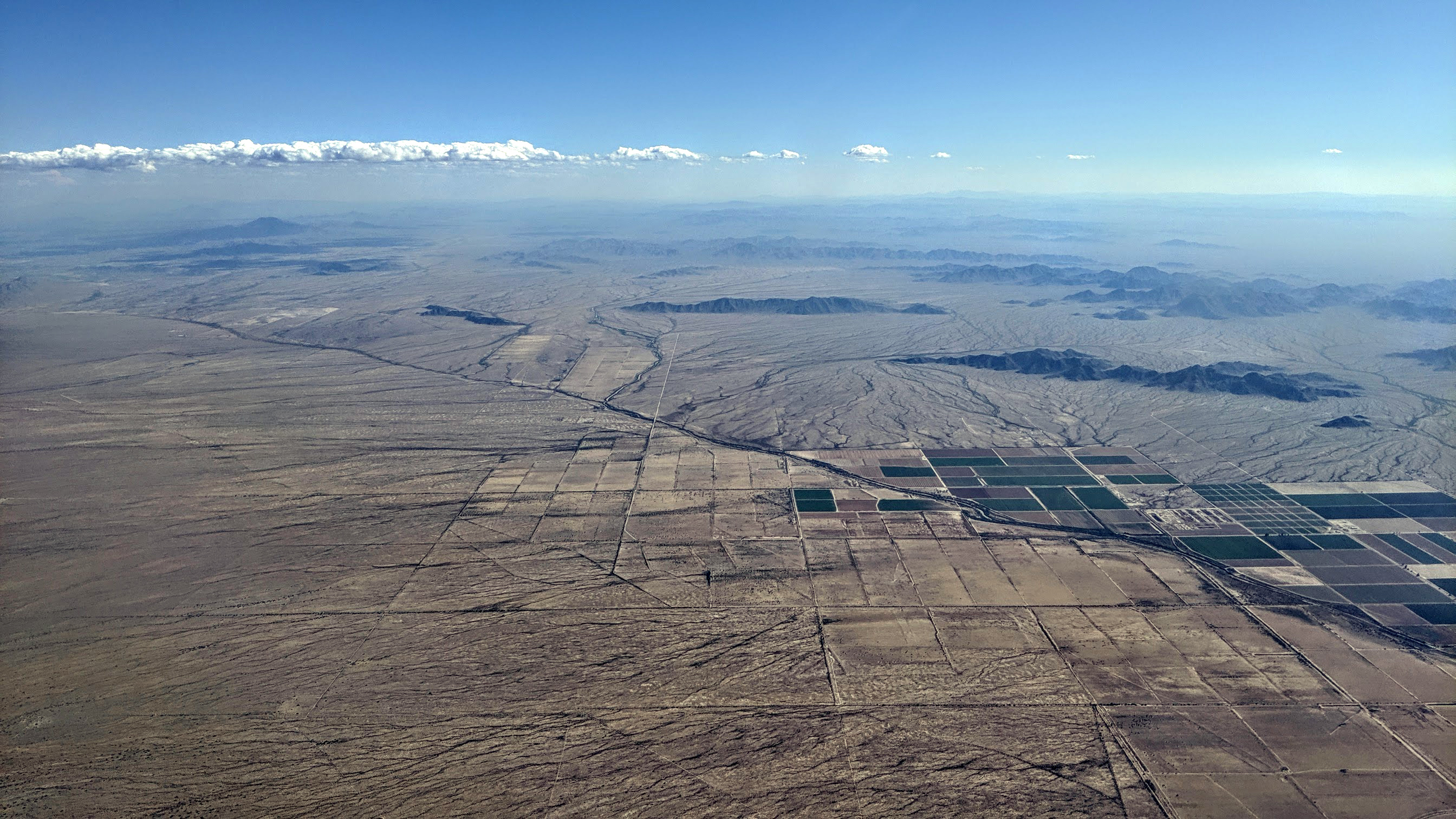
Aerial view of Waterman Wash

Waterman Wash is a tributary stream or arroyo of the Gila River, in Maricopa County, Arizona, United States. Its mouth is at its confluence with the Gila River in the Buckeye Valley at an elevation of 843 feet / 257 meters. Its source is at 33°07′11″N 112°13′10″W at an elevation of 2,400 feet (730 m) on Sevenmile Mountain. Waterman Wash takes in its tributary West Prong Waterman Wash at 33°10′34″N 112°22′00″W.
