= Desert Station =

Butterfield Overland Mail stagecoach stop in Arizona

- Locale
- Location in the state of Arizona
- Coordinates: 33°04′00″N 112°21′31″W
- Country: United States
- State: Arizona
- County: Maricopa County
- Elevation: 1,341 ft (409 m)

Population
  - Total: 0
- Time zone: UTC-7 (MST (no DST))

Desert Station is a historic locale, the site of a later station of the Butterfield Overland Mail, in what is now Maricopa County, Arizona.

== History ==
Desert Station, established in 1859, was 21.82 miles (35.12 km) east of Gila Ranch Station through Pima Pass, amidst the Fortymile Desert in the great bend of the Gila River, on West Prong Waterman Wash. It lay 18.57 miles (29.89 km) west of Maricopa Wells Station. Desert Station had its own well. Two tanks were established on the route, one between Desert Station and Gila Ranch and another between Desert Station and Maricopa Wells station to water the horses as they crossed the desert. The two riverside stations were tasked to carry water to supply the tank nearest them.

In March 1861, the Butterfield line shut down, but during the American Civil War, Desert Station's remained a stop for freighters and passing travelers coming into the New Mexico Territory from the riverport of Arizona City on the Colorado River. It also saw the passage of the troops of the Confederate Army that briefly passed through to the west and then fell back before the advance of the California Column of the Union Army that invaded Confederate Arizona and occupied New Mexico Territory in 1862.
