= Sevenmile Mountain =

Sevenmile Mountain may be a summit:

- Sevenmile Mountain (Arizona) in Maricopa County, Arizona
- Sevenmile Mountain (Texas) in Bell County, Texas
- Sevenmile Mountain (Virginia) in Craig County, Virginia
