= June 1964 =

Month of 1964

<<	June 1964					>>
Su	Mo	Tu	We	Th	Fr	Sa
	1	2	3	4	5	6
7	8	9	10	11	12	13
14	15	16	17	18	19	20
21	22	23	24	25	26	27
28	29	30

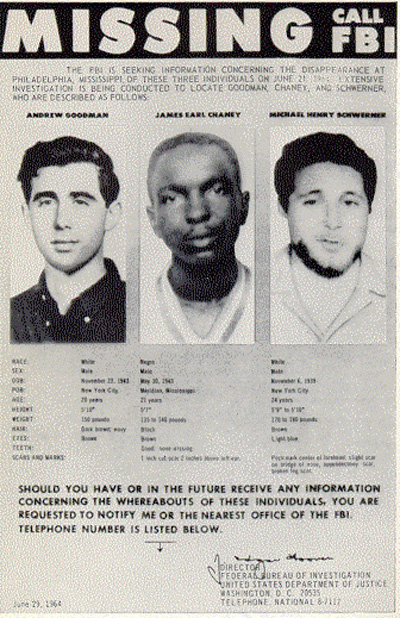
June 21, 1964: Three civil rights workers disappear in rural Mississippi

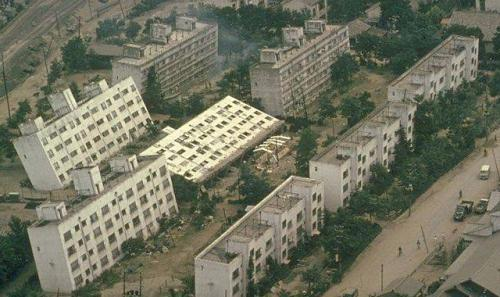
June 16, 1964: Earthquake levels buildings in Japan

June 5, 1964: Prime Minister Pearson proposes new flag for Canada

The following events occurred in June 1964:

== June 1, 1964 (Monday) ==
- The first Yaoundé Convention, signed on July 20, 1963, by 18 African nations (Burundi, Cameroon, the Central African Republic, Chad, the Republic of the Congo (Brazzaville), the Republic of the Congo (Leopoldville), Dahomey, Gabon, the Ivory Coast, the Malagasy Republic, Mali, Mauritania, Niger, Rwanda, Senegal, Somalia, Togo, and Upper Volta), went into effect for a five-year period to govern economic relations between the French-speaking nations that had been colonies of either France or Belgium; Somalia had been a UN Trust Territory composed of former British and Italian colonies. After the expiration on May 31, 1969, a new convention would be signed at Yaoundé on July 29 of that year.
- The United States and the Soviet Union signed a bilateral treaty for the first time in 30 years, allowing for the two superpowers to establish consulates in each other's cities. In addition, it was agreed that if an American citizen was arrested in the USSR, an American consular official would be notified promptly and be given access, and that the same right would apply for a Soviet citizen and a Soviet consular official within the U.S. The pact was signed at the Spiridonovka Palace in Moscow by Soviet Foreign Minister Andrei Gromyko and U.S. Ambassador to the Soviet Union Foy D. Kohler.
- A Canadian Act of Parliament, that had been proposed by Jean Chrétien of Quebec, changed the name of Trans-Canada Air Lines to "Air Canada", effective from January 1, 1965. The new name needed no translation in either the English or French language.
- The parliament of Cyprus, the majority of whom were Greek Cypriot legislators, voted to pass a law over Turkish protests, allowing the government to establish the Cypriot National Guard and giving it authority to draft Greek Cypriot and Turkish Cypriot citizens.
- The Kenya Air Force was established under the command of Group Captain Ian Sargenson Stockwell, formerly of Britain's Royal Air Force. The RAF base located east of Nairobi at Eastleigh was renamed KAF Eastleigh, and is now Moi Air Base.

== June 2, 1964 (Tuesday) ==
- The 424 delegates to the Palestinian National Congress ended their meeting in East Jerusalem in Jordan, and approved a National Charter. Among the articles agreed to were that "Palestine... is an indivisible unit" (Article 2); "Palestinians are those Arab citizens who, until 1947, had normally resided in Palestine" and "anyone born after that date of a Palestinian father" (Article 6); "The partition of Palestine in 1947 and the establishment of Israel are entirely illegal" (Article 17); and "For the realization of the goals of this Charter and its principles, the Palestine Liberation Organization shall perform its complete role in the liberation of Palestine..." (Article 23).
- Serial killer Anatoly Slivko killed his first victim, a 15-year-old runaway named Nikolai Dobryshev. Slivko, who has had erotic fantasies of recreating a 1961 traffic accident he witnessed when a drunken motorcyclist swerved onto a pavement and into a group of pedestrians, fatally injuring a boy in his early teens, claimed this particular victim was killed unintentionally, as he had been unable to revive Dobryshev upon completion of his routine of filming, photography, and masturbation, although he later admitted in one interview with a psychiatrist that the teenager's death triggered a greater sense of arousal within him than his previous, non-fatal hangings.
- U.S. Senator Barry Goldwater of Arizona narrowly defeated New York Governor Nelson Rockefeller in California's Republican presidential primary, giving him all 86 of California's delegates and placing him "on the threshold of the Republican Presidential nomination." Rockefeller, who had been leading in the early reported returns, conceded defeat the next day. Goldwater's win was by a margin of less than 59,000 votes out of more than two million cast, with 1,089,133 for Goldwater and 1,030,180 for Rockefeller. With the California win, Goldwater now had 438 of the necessary 655 votes needed for the nomination.
- Turkey's council for national security, led by Prime Minister İsmet İnönü, voted to intervene militarily in the Republic of Cyprus, despite objections by Foreign Minister Feridun Cemal Erkin. U.S. Ambassador to Turkey Raymond Hare was directed by U.S. President Johnson to "meet at once" with İnönü "calling him out of a cabinet if necessary, to express the administration's gravest concern and to urge restraint." The meeting would take place two days later.
- U.S. President Lyndon Johnson called a White House press conference without advance notice and told reporters that the United States was "bound by solemn commitments" to defend South Vietnam against Communist encroachment, and cited an October 25, 1954 letter from U.S. President Eisenhower to South Vietnam President Ngo Dinh Diem pledging an American promise to protect the Vietnamese government.
- Lal Bahadur Shastri was unanimously selected by the 537 members of India's ruling Congress Party to become the new Prime Minister of India as the successor of the late Jawaharlal Nehru.
- Five million shares of stock in the Communications Satellite Corporation (Comsat) were offered for sale at $20 a share, and the issue was quickly sold out.

== June 3, 1964 (Wednesday) ==
- Kenya and the United Kingdom signed the Defence Agreement of 1964. The Royal Air Force would be able to fly over Kenya, the Royal Navy to put into port at Mombasa, and British forces to train in Kenya twice a year. In return, all British troops in Kenya would be withdrawn by December 12, the British Army would commit to training the Kenya Rifles as a national army, the Royal Air Force would train the newly established Kenya Air Force, and a small Kenya Navy would be established at the end of the year.
- South Korean President Park Chung Hee declared martial law in Seoul after 10,000 student demonstrators overpowered police.
- Died:
  - Frans Eemil Sillanpää, 75, Finnish writer and 1939 Nobel Prize in Literature laureate
  - Gustavo C. Garcia, 48, Mexican-American civil rights attorney, died of liver failure after years of alcohol abuse.

== June 4, 1964 (Thursday) ==
- The crossing of telephone and television lines in the AT&T coaxial cable system caused a disruption for 18 million television viewers across the United States who heard "what may have been the most widely disseminated telephone conversation since Alexander Graham Bell invented the telephone". At 8:13 p.m. Eastern time, people who were watching a rerun of the series Temple Houston on the NBC television network were surprised by two "unsuspecting callers" who were "as nearly as anyone could tell, two women carrying on a friendly conversation somewhere in New York state". Engineers stopped the interference three minutes later, but at 8:45, more of the discussion was heard nationwide by even more viewers tuned into NBC for Dr. Kildare and to ABC for My Three Sons, along with the sound of both programs.
- The first Soviet communications satellite, Molniya-1 No.2, was launched at 05:00 UTC, on a Molniya 8K78 carrier rocket, from Site 1/5 at the Baikonur Cosmodrome. A motor circuit in the servo controlling the core stage throttle failed 104 seconds into the flight, resulting in the throttle becoming jammed closed and the fuel supply to the engines being stopped. Prior to the release of information about its mission, NASA had incorrectly identified the launch of Molniya-1 No.2 as a failed attempt to launch a Zond spacecraft on a circumlunar technology demonstration mission, and assigned it the placeholder designation Zond 1964A.
- Turkey's Prime Minister İnönü outlined his nation's plan for invading Cyprus in a discussion with U.S. Ambassador Raymond A. Hare, explaining that the mission would simply be to occupy part of the island nation, allowing Greece to occupy the other one-half, and having the United Nations peacekeeping force remain between the two zones. Hare asked İnönü to delay the operation by 24 hours so that he could report back to President Johnson.
- The Beatles began their first, and only, world concert tour starting with a performance at the Tivoli Gardens in Copenhagen, and a second concert two days later at a concert hall in the village of Blokker, Netherlands, followed by visits to Hong Kong, Australia and New Zealand. Because drummer Ringo Starr was hospitalized for acute tonsillitis, Jimmie Nicol took his place for the first eight shows on the tour.
- Israel and the European Economic Community signed a trade agreement in Brussels. Present at the Ravenstein Hall at the Palais des Congres were Israeli foreign minister Golda Meir, foreign trade minister Akiva Govrin, Israel's representative to the EEC Amiel Najar, president of the Commission of the Community Walter Hallstein, and Belgian deputy foreign minister Henri Fayat.
- Testing of the Gemini capsule ejection seat system began on a rocket sled at the China Lake testing facility in California. Another test on November 5 would reveal a structural deficiency in the ejection seat. When the feet of one of the dummies came out of the stirrups, the seat pitched over, breaking off the left side panel. The seat and dummy never separated, and both were destroyed when they hit the ground.
- The failing Rolls Razor company's account with Barclays Bank was overdrawn by £485,000. Despite this, John Bloom, managing director, persuaded the company's board of directors to pay out dividends of £209,719.
- The United Nations Security Council passed Resolution 189, condemning military incursions into Cambodia.

== June 5, 1964 (Friday) ==
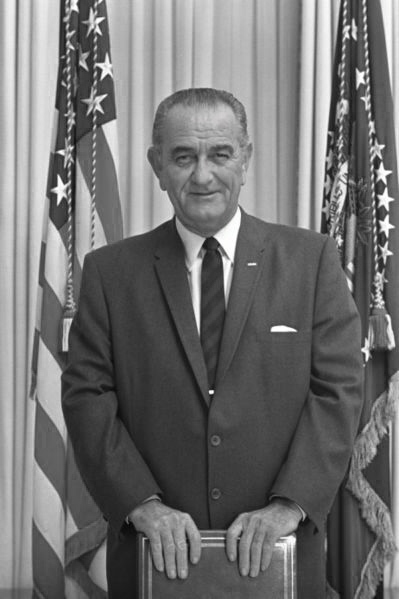
Johnson

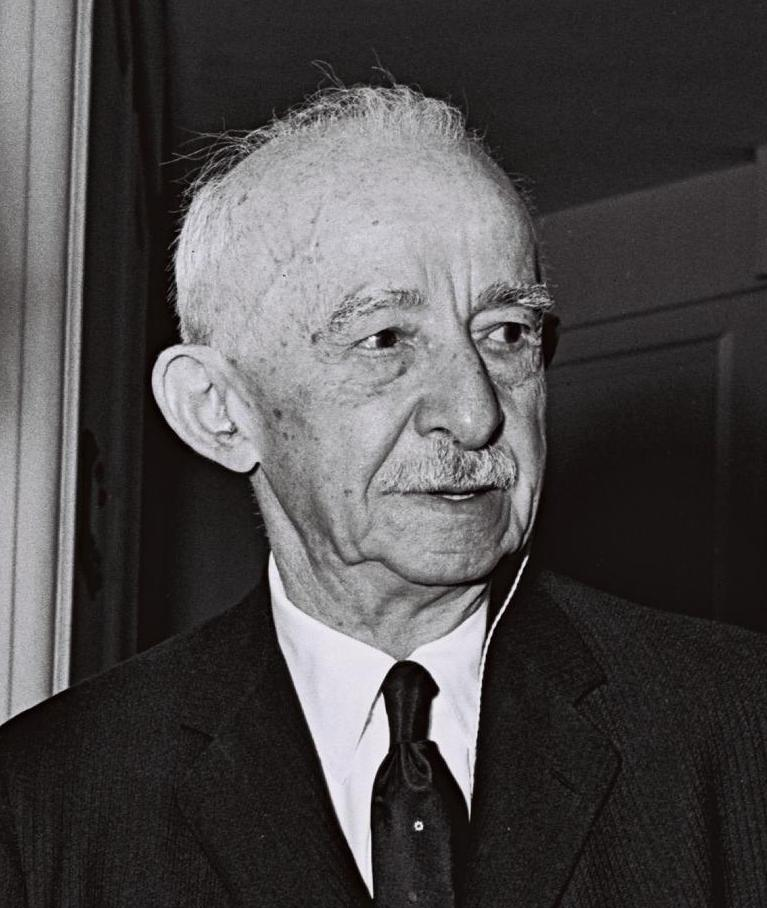
İnönü

- The ban on cremation for members of the Roman Catholic Church was relaxed, though not completely lifted, by order of Pope Paul VI, partially reversing a decree made in 1896, when the Vatican had refused the sacraments to Catholics who had chosen cremation.
- Henry Cabot Lodge, the U.S. Ambassador to South Vietnam, sent a secret cable to President Johnson recommending that the U.S. not send more ground troops into South Vietnam to fight the Viet Cong. Such a step, he cautioned, would be a "venture of unlimited possibilities which could put us onto a slope along which we slide into a bottomless pit." Johnson would disregard Lodge's warning, and the Vietnam War would continue for eight more years.
- U.S. President Johnson sent a secret letter to Turkish Prime Minister İnönü, warning him to call off plans to invade Cyprus. Noting that Turkey's action would begin a war with Greece, "Adhesion to NATO, in its very essence," said the letter, "means that NATO countries will not wage war with each other. Germany and France have buried centuries of animosity and hostility in becoming NATO allies; nothing less can be expected from Greece and Turkey." Adding that a Turkish intervention "could lead to a direct involvement by the Soviet Union", Johnson told İnönü, "I hope you will understand that your NATO allies have not had a chance to consider whether they have an obligation to protect Turkey against the Soviet Union if Turkey takes a step which results in Soviet intervention without the full consent and understanding of its NATO Allies." İnönü would tell his cabinet, "Our friends and our enemies have joined hands against us," and the invasion was called off.
- The United States and the Soviet Union announced that they would work together for the first time on a joint project in outer space in the form of a weather satellite network, along with an exchange of data on space biology and medicine.
- Authorization to begin work on space station studies was announced by U.S. Secretary of the Air Force Eugene M. Zuckert, applying to Douglas Aircraft and General Electric. Zuckert predicted that the Titan III rocket would be tested during the summer and would launch the Manned Orbiting Laboratory as early as 1967.
- Canada's Prime Minister Lester Pearson introduced a resolution in the Canadian House of Commons for a new flag of Canada. Attached to the bill was a picture of his suggestion, "a design with blue borders, a white middle and three maple leaves as on the Canadian coat-of-arms".
- The United States Navy commissioned the deep-ocean research submersible DSV Alvin.
- Born: Rick Riordan, American author best known for the Percy Jackson & the Olympians series of books; in San Antonio, Texas

== June 6, 1964 (Saturday) ==
- The Rolling Stones were introduced to the American public in a pre-recorded segment of the ABC television show The Hollywood Palace. Although they had been flown to Los Angeles for the taping and played three songs, the only part that was televised was a 45-second segment of "I Just Want to Make Love to You" and host Dean Martin made derogatory remarks about the Stones, including "Their hair is not long. It's just smaller foreheads and higher eyebrows."
- Over Laos, Pathet Lao antiaircraft artillery shot down a U.S. Navy RF-8A Crusader photographic reconnaissance aircraft piloted by Lieutenant Charles F. Klusmann. It was the first U.S. Navy aircraft and first American fixed-wing aircraft to be lost over Indochina in the Vietnam War era. Klusmann would be taken as a prisoner of war but would escape a few months later.
- The Taça das Nações soccer football tournament of four nations, nicknamed the "Little World Cup" and held in Brazil to celebrate the 50th anniversary of the founding of the Brazilian Football Confederation, was effectively won by Argentina with a 1 to 0 victory over England, allowing it to finish unbeaten (3–0–0). Although Brazil beat Portugal the next day, 4 to 1, it had lost to Argentina, 3 to 0, on June 3 and could finish no higher than second place.
- Died:
  - Guy Banister, 63, FBI agent cited during the 1967 Trial of Clay Shaw as part of the conspiracy to kill John F. Kennedy
  - Robert Warwick, 85, American stage, film and television actor

== June 7, 1964 (Sunday) ==
- Jack Ruby, who had killed accused presidential assassin Lee Harvey Oswald, testified before the Warren Commission. Since Ruby had been imprisoned since November 24, the questioning took place at the interrogation room of the Dallas County Jail, with Chief Justice Earl Warren and U.S. Congressman Gerald R. Ford from the commission, and began at 11:45 in the morning and lasted for three hours. "I would like to be able to get a lie detector test or truth serum of what motivated me to do what I did at that particular time," Ruby began, "and it seems as you get further into something, even though you know what you did, it operates against you somehow, brainwashes you, that you are weak in what you want to tell the truth and what you want to say which is the truth."
- Died:
  - Violet Attlee, Countess Attlee, 68, wife of former British Prime Minister Clement Attlee died from a cerebral haemorrhage
  - Charlie Llewellyn, 87, the first non-white South African Test cricketer (1896–1912)

== June 8, 1964 (Monday) ==
- The burst of two dams killed 28 people in the U.S. state of Montana, and left 115 missing, as the waters of the Sun River at a depth of up to 6 feet (1.8 m) through entire towns, including Choteau, Montana.
- The UN Trust territory of Papua New Guinea, administered by Australia, convened its first elected legislature, the 64-member House of Assembly of Papua and New Guinea. Previously, the south Pacific islands had been governed by an appointed legislative council. Under the provisions of Australia's Papua and New Guinea Act, 44 of the members were indigenous residents voted upon by people within a geographic electorate, 10 were non-indigenous from special electorates, and the other 10 were appointed by the Governor-General of Australia on the recommendation of the Papua New Guinean administrator.
- A 15-year-old boy in Gila Bend, Arizona, United States, Gerald Gault, was arrested after being accused by Mrs. Ora Cook of having made an obscene phone call. He was placed in the county's juvenile detention center without notice to his parents. The parents' appeal against the sentence would lead to a landmark U.S. Supreme Court decision on May 15, 1967.
- All NASA astronauts began Gemini launch abort training on the Ling-Temco-Vought simulator. Group 1 (selected April 1959) and Group 2 (September 1962) astronauts averaged approximately 100 runs each, while Group 3 (October 1963) astronauts completed 32 runs apiece. Training was completed July 30.
- Born:
  - Elena Andrianovna Nikolaeva-Tereshkova, the first child to be born to two space travelers; in Moscow. Her mother, Valentina Tereshkova, was in orbit space almost a year earlier on Vostok 6, and her father, Andriyan Nikolayev had been on Vostok 3 in August 1962.
  - Fabrizio Cassol, Belgian saxophonist, first to use the aulochrome; in Ougrée
- Died: Carlos Quintanilla, 76, Bolivian general who served as the 37th president of Bolivia for eight months in 1939 and 1940

== June 9, 1964 (Tuesday) ==
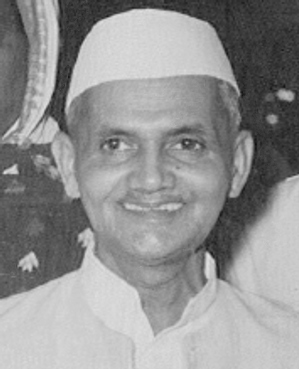
Shastri

- Lal Bahadur Shastri was sworn in as Prime Minister of India, becoming "the second man to rule modern India" since its independence from the United Kingdom. He would serve for a year and a half before his sudden death on January 11, 1966, during a summit in the Soviet Union. In his inaugural broadcast to the nation, "There comes a time in the life of every nation when it stands at the cross-roads of history and must choose which way to go. But for us there need be no difficulty or hesitation, no looking to right or left. Our way was straight and clear—the building up of a socialist democracy at home with freedom and prosperity for all, and the maintenance of world peace and friendship with all nations."
- A federal court jury in Kansas City, Kansas, found army deserter George John Gessner guilty of passing United States secrets to the Soviet Union and sentenced him to life imprisonment. Private Gessner had fled from Fort Bliss in Texas on December 6, 1960, and, two days later, went to the Soviet embassy in Mexico City. He would admit that a month later, in January 1961, he had sold operational and design details of the Mark 7 nuclear bomb, the 280 mm atomic cannon and the 8-inch atomic mortar, in return for a payment of $200. However, his conviction would be reversed on findings that his confession had been made under duress and, on March 8, 1966, the U.S. Department of Justice would drop the charges because "the government had no case against Gessner without a confession."
- Born: Wayman Tisdale, American basketball player; in Fort Worth, Texas (died of cancer, 2009)
- Died: Lord Beaverbrook, 85, Canadian-born newspaper publisher and politician

== June 10, 1964 (Wednesday) ==
- The U.S. Senate voted, 71 to 29, for a cloture to end the longest filibuster in Senate history, 75 days after long opposition speeches by opponents of the Civil Rights Act of 1964. A cloture vote required at least two-thirds of the Senators present, or 67 votes, to pass. U.S. Senator Robert C. Byrd of West Virginia had completed the last of the filibuster speeches at 9:51 in the morning, 14 hours and 13 minutes after he had started at 7:38 the previous evening. The vote marked only the fifth time that cloture had been voted and cleared the way for approval of the bill. Twenty-three Democrats and six Republicans opposed the cloture vote, with 23 of the 24 southern senators, along with Byrd from West Virginia, one each from Nevada, Utah, New Mexico, Wyoming and South Dakota, and both from Arizona, including Republican presidential candidate Barry Goldwater.
- The Convention on the Continental Shelf entered into force after having been ratified by 22 of the 46 nations whose representatives had signed it in Geneva on April 29, 1958.
- Born: Ben Daniels, English stage and television actor; in Nuneaton, Warwickshire

== June 11, 1964 (Thursday) ==
- Brazil's first Institutional Act (the Ato Institucional), promulgated on April 9, expired under its own terms, after President Humberto Castelo Branco had removed 378 public officials from office and suspended their political rights for 10 years. Those affected included 300 local legislators at the state and municipal level; 63 national deputies and two national senators; six state governors; and former presidents João Goulart, Jânio Quadros, and Juscelino Kubitschek. Castelo Branco also fired more than 10,000 civil servants, and retired 77 army officers, 14 navy officers, and 31 air force officers. Investigations continued, however, with the creation the same month of the SNI, the Serviço Nacional de Informações or National Information Service, to spy on Brazil's civilians.
- In the suburb of Volkhoven in Cologne, West Germany, Walter Seifert attacked students and teachers at a Roman Catholic elementary school with a homemade flamethrower, killing 10 and injuring 21. Screaming "Hitler the second has returned!" he set fire to a classroom building with ignited fuel, then torched two other buildings before his fuel supply was spent. Seifert died after being shot by police.
- The new RSFSR Civil Code, governing the rules for lawsuits and other non-criminal proceedings in courts in the Russian SFSR, went into effect in the largest of the Soviet Union's 15 socialist republic, in what is now the Russian Federation.
- The Equal Pay Act of 1963 took effect in the United States, prohibiting wage discrimination by any American employer who was subject to the minimum wage requirements of the Fair Labor Standards Act.
- Died: Plaek Phibunsongkhram, 66, Prime Minister of Thailand from 1938 to 1944, and from 1948 to 1957

== June 12, 1964 (Friday) ==
- East Germany and the Soviet Union signed a 20-year "treaty of friendship" in Moscow but stopped short of a formal peace treaty declaring an end to the USSR's war with Germany during World War II. The agreement stated that the two nations considered West Berlin to be "an independent political unit" rather than a part of West Germany. Soviet premier Nikita Khrushchev and East German Chancellor Walter Ulbricht executed the pact in Moscow. The United States, United Kingdom and France would respond on June 26 with a rejection of the Communist description of West Berlin's status.
- Nelson Mandela and seven co-defendants (Walter Sisulu, Ahmed Kathrada, Govan Mbeki, Denis Goldberg, Raymond Mhlaba, Andrew Mlangeni and Elias Motsoaledi) were sentenced to life imprisonment. Goldberg would be sent to Pretoria, while Mandela and the other black defendants went to the Robben Island prison. Mandela would not be released until 1990, and later would be elected as the first black President of South Africa in 1994.
- Pennsylvania Governor William Scranton announced his candidacy for the Republican presidential nomination, as part of a movement to stop Barry Goldwater from receiving the nomination. By then, Goldwater had picked up 114 more delegates from other states after California, for 562 convention votes, just 93 short of the 655 needed to get the nomination. The next day, he would receive 42 more votes from four more states to reach 618.

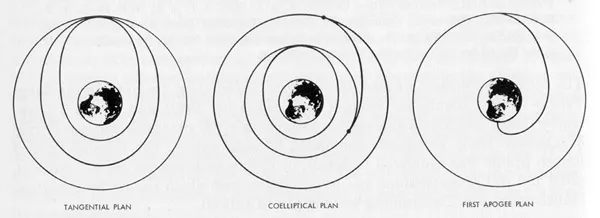
Potential Gemini rendezvous plans

- Christopher C. Kraft, Jr. of the Manned Spacecraft Center reported that three basic plans were under study for Project Gemini space rendezvous missions. Rendezvous of the two spacecraft from concentric orbits would be chosen for the first rendezvous mission, Gemini 6. The other two choices — rendezvous at first apogee and a tangential rendezvous— would probably be rejected.
- Representatives of NASA, McDonnell, Weber Aircraft, and the U.S. Air Force 6511th Test Group met to define the basic objectives of the Gemini personnel recovery system under simulated operational conditions. The plan program called for the recovery system to be ejected from an F-106 aircraft to demonstrate compatibility between the recovery system and the aircraft.

== June 13, 1964 (Saturday) ==
- The first 300 volunteers for the "Freedom Summer" project, to register African-Americans to vote in Mississippi, arrived at the campus of the Western College for Women in Oxford, Ohio. They received instruction from members of the Mississippi chapters of the Student Nonviolent Coordinating Committee (SNCC), the Congress of Racial Equality (CORE), the National Association for the Advancement of Colored People (NAACP) and the Southern Christian Leadership Conference (SCLC).
- Sir Richard Luyt, the colonial Governor of British Guiana (now Guyana) proclaimed a state of emergency and ordered the arrest of 28 politicians and trade union leaders, in the wake of escalating violence arising from a strike of sugar workers.
- Born: Kathy Burke, English actress, comedian, playwright and theatre director; in London

== June 14, 1964 (Sunday) ==
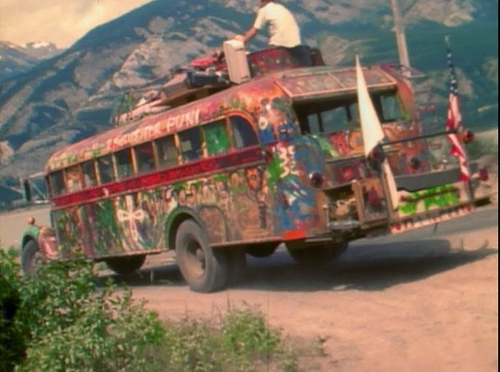
The Further

- American Beatnik author Ken Kesey and his friends, the Merry Pranksters, departed from their commune at La Honda, California, on their bus called "Furthur", on a journey across the United States to the New York World's Fair. The purpose of the trip was for the riders to experience the American road while high on the hallucinogenic drug LSD, which had not yet been outlawed. Author Tom Wolfe would later profile the trip in his bestselling book, The Electric Kool-Aid Acid Test.
- After 18 days, the National Army of Colombia successfully completed its "Operation Marquetalia", the destruction of the "Marquetalia Republic", a leftist guerrilla stronghold in the rural Colombian departamento of Huila. The guerrillas and their allies were dispersed, and anything they left behind was destroyed by the soldiers.
- The government of Romania announced that the Communist nation had released 7,674 political prisoners and that the ruling Romanian Communist Party had plans for a general pardon of "practically all" remaining prisoners of conscience in August. The news came in a statement given by Deputy Premier Alexandru Bârlădeanu.
- Abdirizak Haji Hussein became the new Prime Minister of Somalia, replacing A. A. Shermarke after the Somali Youth League party lost 14 seats in the March 30 election. Hussein would be fired on June 10, 1967, after Shermarke's election as President of Somalia.
- Czechoslovakia held parliamentary elections in which voters were asked to vote for or against the list of 100 National Front (Národní fronta or Národný front) candidates for the National Assembly of Czechoslovakia.
- More than 100 fans of The Beatles required hospital treatment for their injuries when 250,000 people turned out at Melbourne to welcome the British group to its first visit to Australia.
- The 1964 Belgian Grand Prix motor race, held at the Circuit de Spa-Francorchamps, was won by Jim Clark.

== June 15, 1964 (Monday) ==
- In its decision in Reynolds v. Sims, the U.S. Supreme Court ruled, 8 to 1, that the legislative systems of six American states (New York, Maryland, Alabama, Colorado, Virginia and Delaware) were unconstitutional because the apportionment of their districts did not reflect an apportionment of a roughly equal number of people, thus violating the 14th Amendment guarantee of equal protection under the law. The new standards announced by the Court were such that nearly all 50 states would have to reform the apportionment systems of their state senatorial districts to reflect an equal distribution of the population, something not required of the United States Senate.
- The Group of 77 (G77) was formed by developing nations who were members of the United Nations, with the signing of the "Joint Declaration of the Seventy-Seven Countries" at the United Nations Conference on Trade and Development. The founders were almost all of the African, South American and Central American nations, almost all of the Middle Eastern nations (except for Israel), and nearly all of the East Asian nations (except for the People's Republic of China and Australia).
- Born:
  - Courteney Cox, American actress best known for portraying Monica Geller on Friends; in Birmingham, Alabama
  - Michael Laudrup, Danish footballer and manager; in Frederiksberg

== June 16, 1964 (Tuesday) ==
- The collision of two barges with the 26-mile (42 km) long Lake Pontchartrain Causeway bridge in Louisiana created a 240-foot (73 m) wide hole that was large enough for a Continental Trailways bus to fall through. The bus was traveling north on the world's longest bridge, and had traveled 9 miles (14 km) along the Causeway when it encountered the hole at shortly after 1:45 in the morning. Only 8 people were on board the early morning bus, on their way to Jackson, Mississippi from New Orleans, and six of them drowned. The barges were being pushed by the towboat Rebel Jr.; the helmsman of the tugboat said later that he had "fainted and apparently fell against a steering lever which drove the tug and its barges" into the bridge.
- A 7.5 magnitude earthquake struck 60 kilometres (37 miles) offshore from the city of Niigata, Japan at 1:01 in the afternoon local time (0401:44 UTC) and killed 28 people.
- Myra Hindley and Ian Brady abducted Keith Bennett, a 12-year-old boy. Bennett vanished on his way to his grandmother's house in Longsight. Hindley lured him into her Mini pick-up, in which Brady was sitting, by asking for help in loading some boxes, after which she said she would drive the boy home. She drove to a lay-by on Saddleworth Moor, and Brady went off with Bennett, supposedly looking for a lost glove. Hindley kept watch, and after about 30 minutes Brady reappeared, alone and carrying a spade that he had hidden there earlier. When Hindley asked how he had killed Bennett, Brady said that he had sexually assaulted the boy and strangled him with a piece of string.
- Meeting in Dallas, Texas, the 11,000 participants at the Republican state convention in Texas pledged the state's 56 delegates to U.S. Senator Barry Goldwater, while Arkansas pledged 9 of its 12 delegates to the Arizona senator, bringing his total to 660, five more than the 655 needed to clinch the Republican Party nomination in the 1964 presidential race.

== June 17, 1964 (Wednesday) ==
- The catalytic converter became mandatory for the first time in the United States as California's Motor Vehicle Pollution Control Board (MVPCP) forced automobile manufacturers to comply with the state's new regulations requiring motor vehicles sold within its borders to include the converter or another type of vehicle emissions control device. The move came a few days after a spokesman for the U.S. Automobile Manufacturers Association said that GM, Ford and Chrysler would not be able to include the technology for at least two years. California, the first state to require emissions control devices. certified four devices from other vendors. "Faced with the prospect of installing devices made by third parties on their own cars," an author would note later, "the car makers would decide on August 12 to create their own devices within a year."
- In England, a missing persons investigation was launched in Fallowfield, Manchester, as police searched for 12-year-old Keith Bennett, who went missing on the previous evening. The boy's stepfather, Jimmy Johnson, became a suspect; in the two years following Bennett's disappearance, Johnson was taken for questioning on four occasions. Detectives searched under the floorboards of the Johnsons' house, and on discovering that the houses in the row were connected, extended the search to the entire street.
- Died: Joel S. Goldsmith, 72, American spiritual healer and founder of "The Infinite Way" movement

== June 18, 1964 (Thursday) ==
- The first telephone cable between Japan and the United States was inaugurated with a phone call between U.S. President Johnson (in Washington) and Japan Prime Minister Hayato Ikeda in Tokyo. A joint venture between AT&T and the Japanese telephone company Kokusai Denshin Denwa (KDD), the 5,300-mile long undersea cable was laid between Tokyo and Honolulu and gave Japan direct-line communications for the first time between Japan and North America, Europe and Australia.
- Marshal Rodion Malinovsky, Defense Minister for the Soviet Union, signed orders starting the development of the first Soviet space station, the Soyuz-R.
- In Scotland, the typhoid epidemic in Aberdeen, which hand sent 507 people to hospitals from contamination by bacteria traced to a single can of corned beef, was declared to be at an end, more than a month after the first case had been detected on May 12.
- James "Jimmy" Brock, a manager of the Monson Motor Lodge, poured muriatic acid onto the hotel pool to burn a group of black and white protesters during the St. Augustine movement.
- Born: Uday Hussein, Iraqi politician and the elder son of Saddam Hussein. Uday would be killed in a gun battle with U.S. forces during a raid in 2003; in Baghdad
- Died: Giorgio Morandi, 73, Italian painter and printmaker

== June 19, 1964 (Friday) ==
- Groundbreaking was held for the new Bay Area Rapid Transit (BART) system, with an event including U.S. President Johnson in Concord, California. Criticizing Barry Goldwater's views on states' rights, Johnson talked about the federally-aided transit system serving San Francisco and Oakland and said, "The idea that we are 50 separate countries, that the federal government— representing the destiny of 190 million people— does not have duty to meet the needs of these people— this idea is as out of date as the dinosaur." The President arrived by helicopter, "raising huge clouds of dust and whirling papers hundreds of feet into the air" as the pilot flew only 100 feet (30 m) above the crowd of 25,000 at the dedication, and a 70-year-old Concord resident was injured when a metal chair was blown into the crowd.
- Earlier in the day, the 1964 Civil Rights Act was approved by the United States Senate by a vote of 73 to 27. All of the votes against the bill came from the same U.S. Senators who had voted no in the 71–29 approval against ending the filibuster against the bill, including Republican presidential candidate Barry Goldwater of Arizona, who had opposed the measure as an unconstitutional usurpation of state powers by the federal government, rather than on opposition to the rights of African-Americans. U.S. Senators Alan Bible of Nevada and Carl Hayden of Arizona, who had voted against cloture, both voted in favor of the Civil Rights Act.
- Senator Edward Kennedy, 32, and Senator Birch Bayh, 36, were seriously injured in a private plane crash at Southampton, Massachusetts. The pilot, Edward J. Zimny, was killed. Accompanied by a Kennedy aide and by Mrs. Bayh, the two U.S. Senators were flying from Washington, D.C., to attend the Massachusetts Democratic state convention in West Springfield when the twin-engine Aero Commander plunged into an apple orchard. Kennedy broke his back and would be hospitalized for nearly six months, until December 16.
- Prime Minister İsmet İnönü narrowly survived a motion of no confidence in the Grand National Assembly of Turkey, but by only six votes, 200 to 206.
- The last original episode of The Twilight Zone, the CBS science fiction anthology series, was telecast with the showing of "The Bewitchin' Pool".
- Born: Boris Johnson, Prime Minister of the United Kingdom from 2019 to 2022; as Alexander Boris de Pfeffel Johnson in New York City. Johnson's parents, Stanley Johnson and Charlotte Fawcett Johnson (later Charlotte Johnson Wahl), had moved from Britain to Manhattan in 1963 while Stanley was a student at Columbia University.

== June 20, 1964 (Saturday) ==
- U.S. Army Lt. General William C. Westmoreland took charge of Military Assistance Command, Vietnam (MACV), succeeding retiring General Paul D. Harkins. During his four-year command, the number of American troops that he requested for the Vietnam War would increase twenty-fold, from fewer than 25,000 to more than 500,000, and he would continue to guide the conduct of the war as Chief of Staff of the United States Army from 1968 to 1972.
- The crash of Civil Air Transport Flight 106 killed all 57 people aboard. The Curtiss C-46 Commando, operated by the Taiwanese airline Civil Air Transport, crashed near the Fengyuan. Among the dead were 20 Americans, one Briton, and members of the Malaysian delegation to the 11th Film Festival in Asia, including businessman Loke Wan Tho and his wife Mavis. The plane had taken off from Taichung 10 minutes earlier and then exploded.

== June 21, 1964 (Sunday) ==
- The kidnapping and murder of three civil rights activists — Michael Schwerner, 24, and Andrew Goodman, 20, both white New Yorkers, and James Chaney, 21, a black local resident — took place near Philadelphia, Mississippi. The three had left Meridian at 9:00 to travel 40 miles north to Philadelphia to investigate the burning of a church, and failed to return to Meridian at 4:00 that afternoon. After investigating the burning of the Mount Zion Methodist Church in Neshoba County, the three passed through Philadelphia and were arrested by Deputy Sheriff Cecil Price and taken to jail. They were released at 10:30 that night and allowed to drive back toward Meridian under a police escort, then guided to a side road where all three were shot by Alton Wayne Roberts and James Jordan. Under the direction of Deputy Price, the three were buried in an earthen dam. Their bodies would remain undiscovered until August 4.
- Jim Bunning pitched the first perfect game in the National League in 84 years, guiding the Philadelphia Phillies to a 6–0 win over the New York Mets. With no hits, no errors, and no men reaching base, Bunning retired 27 batters. Second baseman Tony Taylor helped save the perfect game in the 5th inning when he dived for a grounder by the Mets' Jesse Gonder and was able to keep Gonder from reaching first base. It marked only the 8th perfect game in major league baseball up to that time. John Montgomery Ward of the Providence Grays had pitched a perfect game on June 17, 1880, in a 5–0 win over the Buffalo Bisons. Bunning would later be elected as a U.S. Representative and then a U.S. Senator from Kentucky.
- Spain beat the Soviet Union, 2–1, to win the 1964 European Nations Cup in front of a crowd of 120,000 people at Madrid.
- The interzonal chess championship ended in a four-way tie in Amsterdam as Denmark's grandmaster, Bent Larsen, finished with 17 points along with three Soviet grandmasters, former world champions Vassily Smyslov and Mikhail Tal, and future world champion Boris Spassky. The final score was reported as "Larsen, Smyslov, Spassky, and Tal 17".
- The École Freudienne de Paris was founded by psychoanalyst Jacques Lacan after his recognition was withdrawn by the International Psychoanalytical Association.
- Born:
  - Oleg Kononenko, Russian cosmonaut; in Chardzhou, Turkmen SSR, Soviet Union (now Türkmenabat, Lebap Region, Turkmenistan)
  - Dean Saunders, Welsh footballer and striker on the Wales national team from 1986 to 2001; in Swansea
  - Patrice Bailly-Salins, French biathlete who won the Biathlon World Championships in 1995; in Morez

== June 22, 1964 (Monday) ==
- The Supreme Court decided Jacobellis v. Ohio, determining that a U.S. state could not ban the exhibition of a film simply on the opinion of a state official that the film was obscene, without due process. In a 6 to 3 ruling, the justices held that Louis Malle's award-winning 1958 French film, The Lovers, but could not agree on a definition of what obscenity was. Four different opinions were written for the majority, with only Arthur Goldberg concurring with William J. Brennan's opinion; and two dissenting opinions were made. The case was famous for the statement by Justice Potter Stewart about "hard-core pornography", which all agreed was not protected by the First Amendment guarantee of freedom of speech. Stewart wrote, "I shall not today attempt further to define the kinds of material I understand to be embraced within that shorthand description; and perhaps I could never succeed in intelligibly doing so. But I know it when I see it..."
- In Cooper v. Pate, the U.S. Supreme Court ruled in a 100-word opinion that state prison inmates had standing to bring lawsuits in federal courts and, by extension, in individual state courts as well. The U.S. District Court in Chicago was ordered to hear Thomas X. Cooper's complaints that he had been deprived of his civil rights by the warden of the Stateville Correctional Center, and a year later, that court would rule in his favor on most of the complaints, in what "marked a turning point for inmates, not only in Illinois but around the country... Before Cooper, all power in prison had flowed from the wardens. Now it flowed from the courts." Thousands of civil rights lawsuits would be filed by inmates and "the nation's prisons, many of them truly awful places, were vastly improved."
- Abe Segal of South Africa defeated Clark Graebner of the U.S. in the first round of Wimbledon in straight sets, 6–2, 7–5, 6–2. The tennis match made headlines worldwide because the line umpire, Dorothy Cavis-Brown, had fallen asleep and did not call the match point when Graebner's shot was out by a couple of feet. Graebner laughed and conceded the point, and the crowd laughed as Cavis-Brown, who was exhausted from overwork, continued sleeping until a ball boy woke her up.
- In the Ashes, the annual test cricket series between England and Australia, batsman John Edrich was first up for England and scored 120 runs before being retired. Despite a 246 to 176 lead for England after the first of two innings, the second Test at Lord's Cricket Ground ended in a draw the next day because of heavy rains.
- The Gemini Recovery School, conducted by the NASA Flight Operations Directorate, began operations at Kindley Air Force Base in Bermuda. This was the first such training course for Gemini offered to recovery personnel, including pararescue crews, Air Force navigators, and maintenance personnel.
- Born:
  - Miroslav Kadlec, Czech soccer football defender who played for the Czechoslovakia national team (1987–1993) and the Czech Republic team (1994–1997); in Uherské Hradiště, Czechoslovakia
  - Amy Brenneman, American TV actress best known for the title role in Judging Amy; in New London, Connecticut
  - Dan Brown, American author of The Da Vinci Code; in Exeter, New Hampshire
  - Hiroshi Abe, Japanese film actor; in Yokohama

== June 23, 1964 (Tuesday) ==
- Jack Kilby was awarded U.S. Patent No. 3,138,743 (filed on February 6, 1959) for his invention of the miniature integrated circuit that made portable electronic devices, including hand-held computers, possible. Kilby, along with Zhores Alferov and Herbert Kroemer, would receive the Nobel Prize in Physics in 2000.
- The burned remains of the station wagon belonging to civil rights activists Michael Schwerner, Andrew Goodman and James Chaney were found roughly 100 feet (30 m) off of Mississippi Highway 21 in Neshoba County, about 15 miles (24 km) northeast of Philadelphia, Mississippi. There was no trace of the three men.
- Born: Lou Yun, Chinese gymnast and 1987 vaulting world champion; in Hangzhou, Zhejiang province

== June 24, 1964 (Wednesday) ==
- The U.S. Federal Trade Commission ruled that all cigarette package labels would be required, by January 1, to include a warning, displayed "clearly and prominently", that cigarette smoking could cause death from cancer and other diseases. The FTC added that all cigarette advertising would be required to include the warning by July 1, 1965. The original warning, as required by Congress in 1965, was "Cigarette Smoking May be Hazardous to Your Health."
- Construction of Gemini-Agena facilities at complex 14 was completed.
- Born: Christopher Steele, British intelligence officer and investigator; to British parents in Aden, Federation of South Arabia (now Yemen)
- Died: Stuart Davis, 71, American painter

== June 25, 1964 (Thursday) ==
- Eduardo Mondlane, leader of FRELIMO (Frente de Libertação de Moçambique), the Mozambique Liberation Front, announced the beginning of a guerrilla war against the colonial leaders of Portuguese East Africa. Portuguese agents would assassinate Mondlane in 1969, but FRELIMO would ultimately sign the Lusaka Accord on September 7, 1974, after ten years of war. Portugal would grant Mozambique independence on June 25, 1975.
- In parliamentary elections for Swaziland, still a British protectorate surrounded by South Africa, the Imbokodvo National Movement won all eight of the "open" seats reserved for black Africans. The United Swaziland Association won the four reserved and four European seats for white candidates, and another eight seats went to traditional chiefs.
- Prince Albert Taylor, Jr. became the first African-American bishop of the Methodist Church to be assigned to a primarily white American congregation, becoming the bishop for New Jersey. He was followed two weeks later, on July 10, by the appointment of James Samuel Thomas as the bishop for Iowa.
- Born: Johnny Herbert, English racing driver and winner of 24 Hours of Le Mans in 1991; in Brentwood, Essex
- Died:
  - Princess Auguste of Bavaria, 89, member of the Bavarian Royal House of Wittelsbach and the spouse of Archduke Joseph August of Austria.
  - Gerrit Rietveld, 76, Dutch architect and designer
  - Raymond G. McCarthy, 63, American expert on alcoholism and Yale University professor who pioneered the treatment of alcoholism as a disease. In 1953, his study concluded that at least 3,000,000 Americans were alcoholic, out of 68 million who consumed alcohol.

== June 26, 1964 (Friday) ==
- Near Marshalls Creek, Pennsylvania, six people were killed, and 10 injured, in the blast of a truck hauling 15 tonnes (15 long tons; 17 short tons) of explosives. The driver had been transporting a cargo for the American Cyanamid company when he had a blowout of two tires, then kept driving until he could find a place to pull off the road. His tires were smoldering as he detached the cab from the trailer, and, while he was driving down the road to find a payphone, the truck caught fire. Three volunteer firemen were killed in the explosion of nitro carbon nitrate (NCN) and gelatin dynamite, along with a nearby resident, a passing motorist, and another truck driver who had spotted the fire. The driver would later be acquitted in a trial for involuntary manslaughter.
- A U.S. Air Force LC-130 Hercules transport plane, specially equipped with landing skis, became the first aircraft to land in Antarctica during the Antarctic winter season, when storms generally make the continent inaccessible. Piloted by Navy Lt. R. V. Mayer and carrying a team of medical specialists from Bethesda Naval Hospital, the plane arrived at McMurdo Station "on an ice runway just cleared of fresh snow" after an eight-and-a-half-hour flight from Christchurch, New Zealand, for the final leg of a 10,000-mile (16,000 km) journey that had started two days earlier from Quonset, Rhode Island, and took off later in the morning. The hazardous mission was undertaken after a member of the Navy's Seabees construction battalion, Petty Officer Bethel L. McMullen, had been seriously injured in a fall.
- Moise Tshombe returned to the Democratic Republic of the Congo after a one-year exile in Spain. Congolese President Joseph Mobutu requested that the former Prime Minister, who had once led an attempted secession, return in order to prevent a rebellion in the east, and sent Belgian journalist Pierre Davister to convey the invitation.
- Born: Zeng Jinlian, Chinese victim of gigantism, verified (at 8'1" or 246.3 cm) as the tallest woman in history (d. 1982); in Yuanjiang, Hunan province.

== June 27, 1964 (Saturday) ==
- On completion of a series of exhumations at the former Jasenovac concentration camp in Croatia, a team estimated that the grounds of Donja Gradina held the remains of 366,000 victims of anti-Serbian extermination practices during the Second World War. In 1989, Serbian anthropologist Srboljub Živanović would publish what he claimed were the full results of the 1964 studies, which in his words had been "suppressed by Tito's government in the name of brotherhood and unity, in order to put less emphasis on the crimes of the Croatian Ustaše".
- Singer Ethel Merman and TV actor Ernest Borgnine were married at his home in Beverly Hills, California, then set off on a honeymoon in Asia before Borgnine's scheduled July 27 obligation to begin filming the new season of his TV show, McHale's Navy. The two would be married for only 38 days before separating on August 4, and would divorce by November.
- Born: Kai Diekmann, German journalist and the chief editor of the tabloid Bild from 2001 to 2015; in Bielefeld, West Germany
- Died: Mona Barrie, 54, English-born film actress, died from undisclosed causes.

== June 28, 1964 (Sunday) ==
- Britt Sullivan, a 29-year-old veteran of the U.S. Navy's WAVES program, disappeared in shark-infested waters on the third day of her attempt at a trans-Atlantic swim between New York and England. The skipper of her escort boat, the Marine Center, told the U.S. Coast Guard that she had been pulled from the water "because a big school of sharks came within 30 yards of her" and that "a short time later she reentered the water and began swimming once again". Sullivan, whose journey had started on Friday from Coney Island, had planned "to swim 18 hours a day and rest six" on the 3,178-mile (5,114 km) journey. The Coast Guard would abandon its search after two days after finding no trace of Ms. Sullivan.
- A body found in the United Kingdom, in the woods near Bracknell, led to a significant case in the history of the use of entomology to assist criminal investigations. By studying the maggots found on the body, forensic entomologist Professor Keith Simpson was able to establish the date of death at around June 16. Missing persons records for that date led the police to believe that the body was that of Peter Thomas, who had gone missing from his home in Lydney. William Brittle, a business partner of Thomas, would subsequently be convicted of the murder.
- France's Foreign Minister Maurice Couve de Murville participated in the live TV news interview program to be transmitted across the Atlantic Ocean. Speaking from a studio in Paris to the New York moderators on the NBC show Meet the Press, Couve cautioned that the United States could not win the Vietnam War if it increased its involvement. "This is not an ordinary war," he said. "That means a war you can just settle by victory or defeat. It is not that simple.... the problem cannot be settled by military means but should be settled by political means."
- Greece and Bulgaria signed 12 agreements to settle all pending disputes between the two nations, including the payment by Bulgaria to Greece of seven million dollars of war reparations arising from World War II, when Bulgaria had been part of the Axis powers invading Greece.
- Malcolm X announced the creation of the Organization of Afro-American Unity in a speech at the Audubon Ballroom in New York. He would be assassinated in the same ballroom less than eight months later, on February 21, 1965.
- The 1964 French Grand Prix was held at the Rouen-Les-Essarts circuit and was won by American Dan Gurney.
- Born:
  - Mark Grace, American baseball player and first baseman; in Winston-Salem, North Carolina
  - Tommy Lynn Sells, American serial killer; in Oakland, California (executed, 2013)
- Died: Eduards Kalniņš, 87, Latvian general

== June 29, 1964 (Monday) ==
- The People's Republic of China successfully tested the Dongfeng-2, its first medium range ballistic missile, a few months before it exploded its first atomic bomb. The Dongfeng-2 had a range of 1,500 kilometres (930 miles), making it capable of striking Japan from China.
- New Zealand began its first military involvement in the Vietnam War by deploying a 25-man contingent of the New Zealand Army at the Tan Son Nhut airport near Saigon.
- Manx Radio became the first radio station on the Isle of Man in the United Kingdom, as a 50-watt FM station with studios in the island's capital at Douglas. As Radio Vannin, it also provided the first Manx language radio programs, which were on for a few hours a week in addition to its English programming.
- Died: Eric Dolphy, 36, African-American jazz saxophonist died from complications of diabetes while in West Berlin during a European tour.

== June 30, 1964 (Tuesday) ==
- UNOC, the United Nations Operation in the Congo, came to an end with the withdrawal of the last UN peacekeeping troops from the former Belgian Congo after four years. Major General Johnson Aguiyi-Ironsi, commander of the first Nigerian Battalion and the future President of Nigeria, was the last of the 143 UN men on the force to board the chartered plane. His 85-member contingent, and the 58 men of the 57th division of the Canadian Army, were the only remaining UN forces, whose departure coincided with the resignation of Congolese premier Cyrille Adoula.
- Twenty-two employees of the Reading and Bates Drilling Company were killed, and 26 injured, in the explosion of an offshore oil platform in the Gulf of Mexico, about 72 miles (116 km) off the coast of Morgan City, Louisiana. Only nine bodies were recovered, and the remaining 13 were presumed to have sunk with the rig in 185 feet (56 m) of water.
