= Gila Bend, Arizona =

Town in Maricopa County, Arizona

- Town
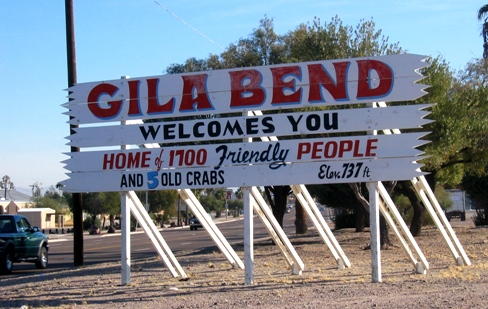
- A humorous, numerically outdated sign welcomes people to Gila Bend.

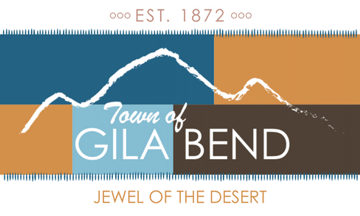
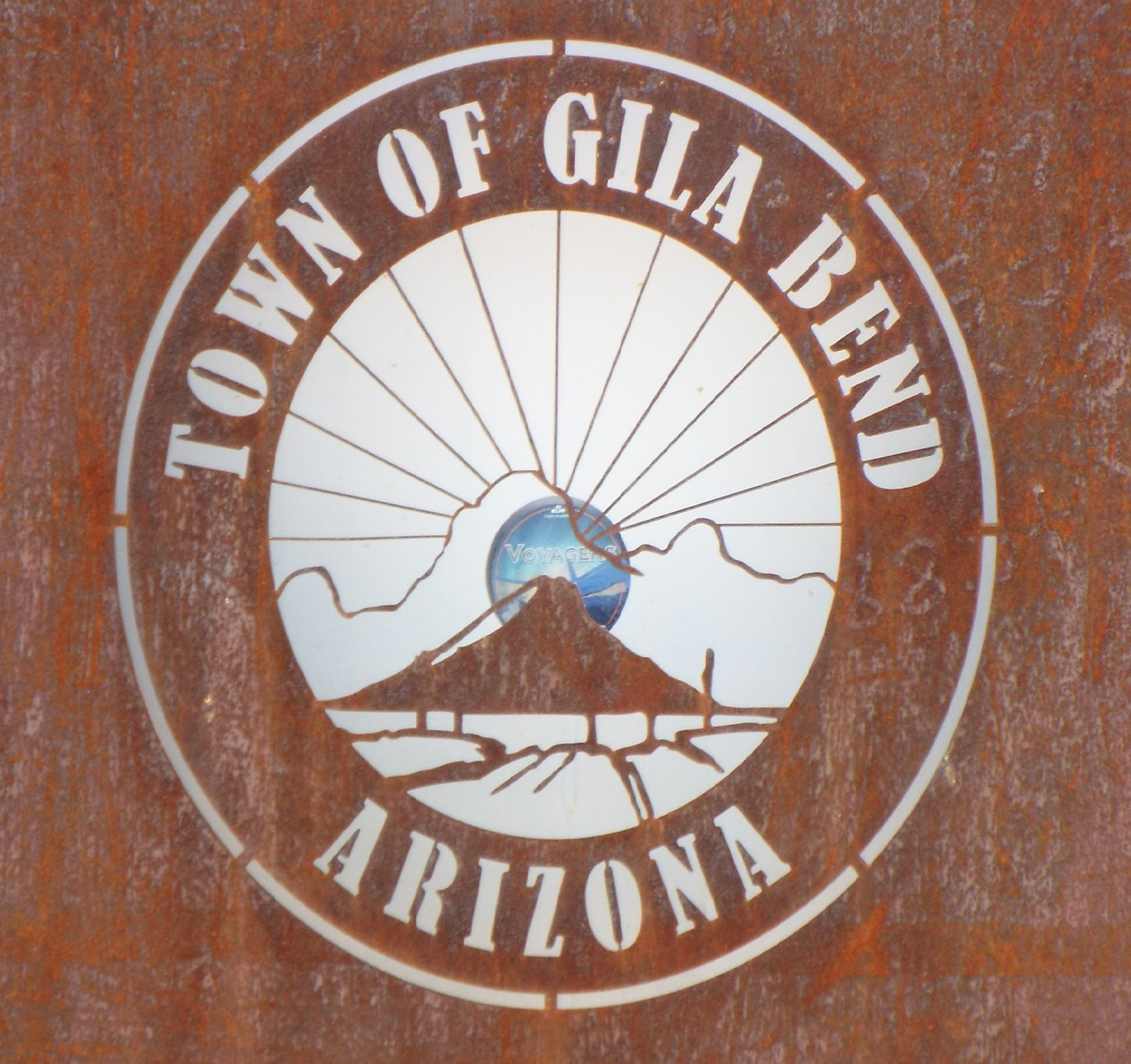
- Flag Seal

- Location in Maricopa County, Arizona

- Location within Arizona Location within the United States
- Coordinates: 32°56′52″N 112°43′01″W
- Country: United States
- State: Arizona
- County: Maricopa
- Founded: 1872
- Incorporated: 1962

Government
  - Mayor: Tommy Sikes
  - Town Manager: Katherine Valenzuela

Area
  - Total: 64.37 sq mi (166.71 km^{2})
  - Land: 64.37 sq mi (166.71 km^{2})
  - Water: 0 sq mi (0.00 km^{2})
- Elevation: 696 ft (212 m)

Population (2020)
  - Total: 1,892
  - Density: 29.4/sq mi (11.35/km^{2})
- Time zone: UTC-7 (MST (no DST))
- ZIP code: 85337
- Area code: 928
- FIPS code: 04-27050
- GNIS feature ID: 2412681
- Website: www.gilabendaz.org

Gila Bend (/ˌhiːlə ˈbɛnd/; O'odham: Hila Wi:n), founded in 1872, is a town in Maricopa County, Arizona, United States. The town is named for an approximately 90-degree bend in the Gila River, which is near the community's current location. As of the 2020 census, the population of the town was 1,892.

== History ==
=== Oyadaibuc ===
The town of Gila Bend is situated near an ancient Hohokam village. Father Eusebio Francisco Kino was the first European to visit, arriving in 1699 on his first journey of exploration to the Colorado River. The Hohokam site along the fertile banks of the Gila River had been abandoned, and other tribes lived in the vicinity. 132 Pima people lived in a ranchería called Oyadaibuc, or as Kino named it San Felipe y Santiago del Oyadaibuc, near the modern town, and other Pima lived in three rancherias up river to the north mixed with the Cocomaricopa or Opa. During one of his three visits to Gila Bend, Kino counted 960 Opas living in their own rancherias down river to the west of Oyadaibuc as far as a few miles beyond Agua Caliente. The Opa and Pima used the flood waters of the river to irrigate their crops.

Oyadaibuc was also visited by Juan Bautista de Anza, commander of the Presidio at Tubac and founder of the city of San Francisco, and by Father Francisco Tomas Garces in 1774. As late as the 1820s Maricopa were living at Gila Bend. After the 1820s, the Maricopa, under relentless pressure from the Yuma and other tribes, and population loss from epidemics, were compelled to leave the Gila Bend and join the Pima in the Middle Gila region. By the time of the California Gold Rush, the Maricopa villages were all located east of the Sierra Estrella, on the Gila River, below the Pima Villages.

=== Tezotal ===
During the Mexican–American War, the expeditions of Kearny (1846), Cooke (1847) and Graham (1847) passed through the area but found no village. Only Graham found corn stubble on the riverside with which to graze his cattle. From 1849, what became the Southern Emigrant Trail passed through the area, which by 1854 had acquired the name Tezotal or Tesotal, from the scientific name of the desert ironwood tree (Olneya tesota), given it in the botanical report of the Boundary Survey along the Gila River led by William H. Emory.

=== Gila Ranch ===
From 1857, the place at 33°00′01.87″N 112°41′55.83″W was named "Gila Ranch" and was a stagecoach water and camping stop on the San Antonio-San Diego Mail Line. In 1858 as "Gila Ranch Station", it was a stage station on the more famous Butterfield Overland Mail route to California. Gila Bend Station was located 17 miles (27 km) east of Murderer's Grave Station and 40 miles (64 km) west of Maricopa Wells Station across the waterless Forty Mile Desert. In 1859, Desert Station was established with its own well on West Prong Waterman Wash, roughly midway across the Forty Mile Desert. Also two tanks were established, one midway between Desert Station and Gila Ranch and the other midway between Desert Station and Maricopa Wells stations, to water the horses. The two riverside stations carried the water to supply these tanks. In 1860 the Gila Ranch station was burned down, but soon rebuilt. In 1861, the Butterfield line shut down, but during the American Civil War Gila Ranch remained a stop for freighters to and from the riverport of Arizona City on the Colorado River, passing travelers, the troops of the Confederate Army that briefly passed through and then the California Column of the Union Army that invaded Confederate Arizona and occupied New Mexico Territory in 1862.

=== Gila Bend ===
After the Civil War, from 1866 other stage routes were established in the Arizona Territory, and the Gila Ranch Station again was an active stage station. A settlement, Gila Bend, grew up around it from 1865 and acquired a post office at the station on May 1, 1871. Stage and freight routes, especially from the mining camps and boom towns in central Arizona, converged here especially after the railroad arrived in 1879. In 1880, after wells had been drilled by the railroad near their Gila Bend station (that was located away from the river), the population began to move to settle at a new town 4 miles (6 km) south-southwest of the old one near the station. Among the first to move was the postmaster at the old stage station, now postmaster of the new town.

The nickname the "Crossroads of the Southwest" stems from the area having been part of an important transportation route in the settling, development and growth of the American Southwest. Gila Bend was the "center of a wheel", with spokes leading in many directions.

A more recent event in the area was the October 1995 sabotage of the Amtrak Sunset Limited train.

On December 14, 2006, Volkswagen of America, Inc., leased 11,900 acres (48 km^{2}) of land at a cost of $55 million for 25 years, 10 miles (16 km) west of Gila Bend, on which they plan to develop a new automobile proving ground.

Gila Bend is a minor notability among tourists and fans of roadside attractions. Besides the unusual welcome sign, the town has several roadside sculptures and the Space Age Lodge motel and restaurant (opened in 1963), named for its "Space Age" themed architecture and decor.

In 2010 Abengoa Solar secured a US$1.45 billion loan guarantee to build a large 280 megawatt concentrated solar power plant in Gila Bend. It was estimated that the project would employ a peak of 1,500 workers, with an operational permanent employment of approximately 85 workers. The Solana Generating Station began providing power for Arizona Public Service in 2013.

== Geography ==
The town is in southwestern Maricopa County, just off Interstate 8 on Arizona State Route 85, which provides access between I-8 and Interstate 10 to the north of Gila Bend. In recognition of historical routes that pass through the area, the town's website refers to Gila Bend as "The Crossroads of the Southwest". It is 68 miles (109 km) southwest of Phoenix via I-10 and AZ 85, 122 miles (196 km) northwest of Tucson via I-10 and I-8, and 116 miles (187 km) east of Yuma via I-8.

According to the United States Census Bureau, the town has a total area of 64.4 square miles (167 km^{2}), all of it land. Situated at 735 feet (224 m) above sea level, Gila Bend has the lowest elevation of any city in Maricopa County and in Greater Phoenix overall.

=== Climate ===
Gila Bend has an arid desert climate, characterized by extremely hot summers and warm winters. The average annual rainfall is approximately 7 inches (180 mm).

During the winter months, daytime highs average about 65 to 75 °F (18 to 24 °C). As typical with the desert in relatively undeveloped areas, there is nothing to keep the heat continuing after the sun sets, so temperatures rapidly drop after sunset. Sometimes this swing can be larger than 30 degrees. This means that average wintertime night lows are about 40 to 50 °F (4 to 10 °C), with an occasional night lower than 40 °F (4 °C). The all-time lowest recorded temperature in Gila Bend was 10 °F (−12 °C), which occurred on January 13, 1963.

Gila Bend has extremely hot summers with the highest temperatures recorded for the state of Arizona, and temperatures at or exceeding 110 °F (43 °C) are the norm for the entirety of summer as well as the beginning of September. Even the month of May experiences some days above 100 °F (38 °C). With an average July high of 109 °F (43 °C), temperatures exceeding 115 °F (46 °C) are common for the area, especially for that particular month. Lows during the summer are generally in the upper 70s and low 80s. The all-time highest recorded temperature in Gila Bend is 122 °F (50 °C), which occurred on June 26, 1990, and again on July 28, 1995.

Climate data for Gila Bend, Arizona, 1991–2020 normals, extremes 1892–present
Month	Jan	Feb	Mar	Apr	May	Jun	Jul	Aug	Sep	Oct	Nov	Dec	Year
Record high °F (°C)	90 (32)	95 (35)	108 (42)	110 (43)	121 (49)	122 (50)	122 (50)	120 (49)	120 (49)	114 (46)	99 (37)	90 (32)	122 (50)
Mean maximum °F (°C)	79.5 (26.4)	83.5 (28.6)	92.3 (33.5)	101.0 (38.3)	107.8 (42.1)	113.6 (45.3)	116.1 (46.7)	114.8 (46.0)	111.1 (43.9)	103.6 (39.8)	90.3 (32.4)	78.8 (26.0)	116.8 (47.1)
Mean daily maximum °F (°C)	71.1 (21.7)	74.8 (23.8)	81.8 (27.7)	89.5 (31.9)	97.8 (36.6)	107.3 (41.8)	109.2 (42.9)	108.6 (42.6)	103.7 (39.8)	92.9 (33.8)	79.7 (26.5)	69.5 (20.8)	90.5 (32.5)
Daily mean °F (°C)	56.2 (13.4)	59.6 (15.3)	65.6 (18.7)	72.1 (22.3)	80.3 (26.8)	89.5 (31.9)	95.0 (35.0)	94.6 (34.8)	88.7 (31.5)	76.5 (24.7)	63.8 (17.7)	54.8 (12.7)	74.7 (23.7)
Mean daily minimum °F (°C)	41.3 (5.2)	44.3 (6.8)	49.3 (9.6)	54.7 (12.6)	62.7 (17.1)	71.7 (22.1)	80.7 (27.1)	80.6 (27.0)	73.6 (23.1)	60.1 (15.6)	47.9 (8.8)	40.0 (4.4)	58.9 (15.0)
Mean minimum °F (°C)	29.0 (−1.7)	34.0 (1.1)	38.2 (3.4)	44.2 (6.8)	52.2 (11.2)	62.0 (16.7)	70.3 (21.3)	70.8 (21.6)	61.5 (16.4)	45.5 (7.5)	34.8 (1.6)	27.8 (−2.3)	25.5 (−3.6)
Record low °F (°C)	10 (−12)	23 (−5)	25 (−4)	28 (−2)	39 (4)	42 (6)	47 (8)	54 (12)	37 (3)	31 (−1)	22 (−6)	15 (−9)	10 (−12)
Average precipitation inches (mm)	0.76 (19)	0.93 (24)	0.67 (17)	0.26 (6.6)	0.35 (8.9)	0.13 (3.3)	0.59 (15)	0.94 (24)	0.30 (7.6)	0.37 (9.4)	0.46 (12)	0.58 (15)	6.34 (161.8)
Average precipitation days (≥ 0.01 in)	2.4	3.1	2.5	0.9	0.5	0.1	2.5	3.9	1.5	1.2	1.3	2.6	22.5
Source 1: NOAA
Source 2: National Weather Service

== Demographics ==
Historical population
Census	Pop.	Note	%±
1910	199		—
1920	745		274.4%
1930	1,275		71.1%
1960	1,813		—
1970	1,795		−1.0%
1980	1,585		−11.7%
1990	1,747		10.2%
2000	1,980		13.3%
2010	1,922		−2.9%
2020	1,892		−1.6%
2022 (est.)	1,876	▼	−0.8%
U.S. Decennial Census

=== 2020 census ===
As of the 2020 census, Gila Bend had a population of 1,892. The median age was 32.6 years. 33.4% of residents were under the age of 18 and 13.1% of residents were 65 years of age or older. For every 100 females there were 100.6 males, and for every 100 females age 18 and over there were 98.7 males age 18 and over.

0.0% of residents lived in urban areas, while 100.0% lived in rural areas.

There were 629 households in Gila Bend, of which 45.9% had children under the age of 18 living in them. Of all households, 49.1% were married-couple households, 18.0% were households with a male householder and no spouse or partner present, and 25.0% were households with a female householder and no spouse or partner present. About 19.6% of all households were made up of individuals and 10.0% had someone living alone who was 65 years of age or older.

There were 715 housing units, of which 12.0% were vacant. The homeowner vacancy rate was 0.0% and the rental vacancy rate was 9.6%.

Racial composition as of the 2020 census
Race	Number	Percent
White	625	33.0%
Black or African American	12	0.6%
American Indian and Alaska Native	157	8.3%
Asian	14	0.7%
Native Hawaiian and Other Pacific Islander	1	0.1%
Some other race	474	25.1%
Two or more races	609	32.2%
Hispanic or Latino (of any race)	1,369	72.4%

=== 2000 census ===
As of the census of 2000, there were 1,980 people, 659 households, and 492 families residing in the town. The population density was 86.7 inhabitants per square mile (33.5/km^{2}). There were 766 housing units at an average density of 33.5 per square mile (12.9/km^{2}). The racial makeup of the town was 51.3% White, 1.3% Black or African American, 10.3% Native American, 0.4% Asian, 32.4% from other races, and 4.3% from two or more races. 52.6% of the population were Hispanic or Latino of any race.

There were 659 households, out of which 42.8% had children under the age of 18 living with them, 52.7% were married couples living together, 14.3% had a female householder with no husband present, and 25.3% were non-families. 22.2% of all households were made up of individuals, and 8.6% had someone living alone who was 65 years of age or older. The average household size was 3.00 and the average family size was 3.51.

In the town, the population was spread out, with 32.9% under the age of 18, 11.6% from 18 to 24, 27.0% from 25 to 44, 20.1% from 45 to 64, and 8.4% who were 65 years of age or older. The median age was 29 years. For every 100 females, there were 105.4 males. For every 100 females age 18 and over, there were 107.8 males.

The median income for a household in the town was $26,895, and the median income for a family was $30,403. Males had a median income of $25,284 versus $20,588 for females. The per capita income for the town was $10,793. About 22.2% of families and 24.8% of the population were below the poverty line, including 29.3% of those under age 18 and 23.8% of those age 65 or over.
