= July 1964 =

Month of 1964

<<	July 1964					>>
Su	Mo	Tu	We	Th	Fr	Sa
			1	2	3	4
5	6	7	8	9	10	11
12	13	14	15	16	17	18
19	20	21	22	23	24	25
26	27	28	29	30	31

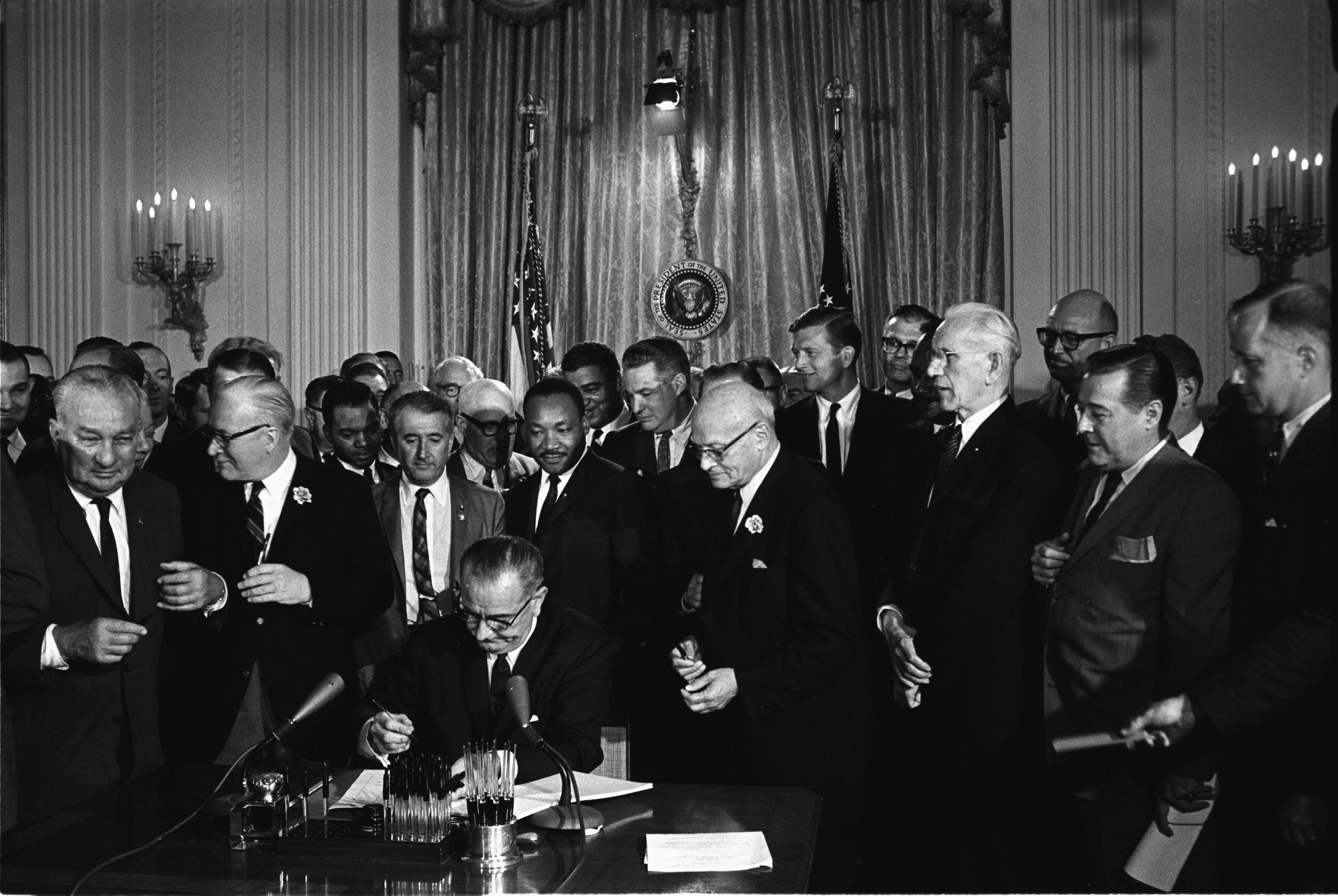
July 2, 1964: U.S. President Johnson signs the Civil Rights Act into law

July 6, 1964: Malawi granted independence

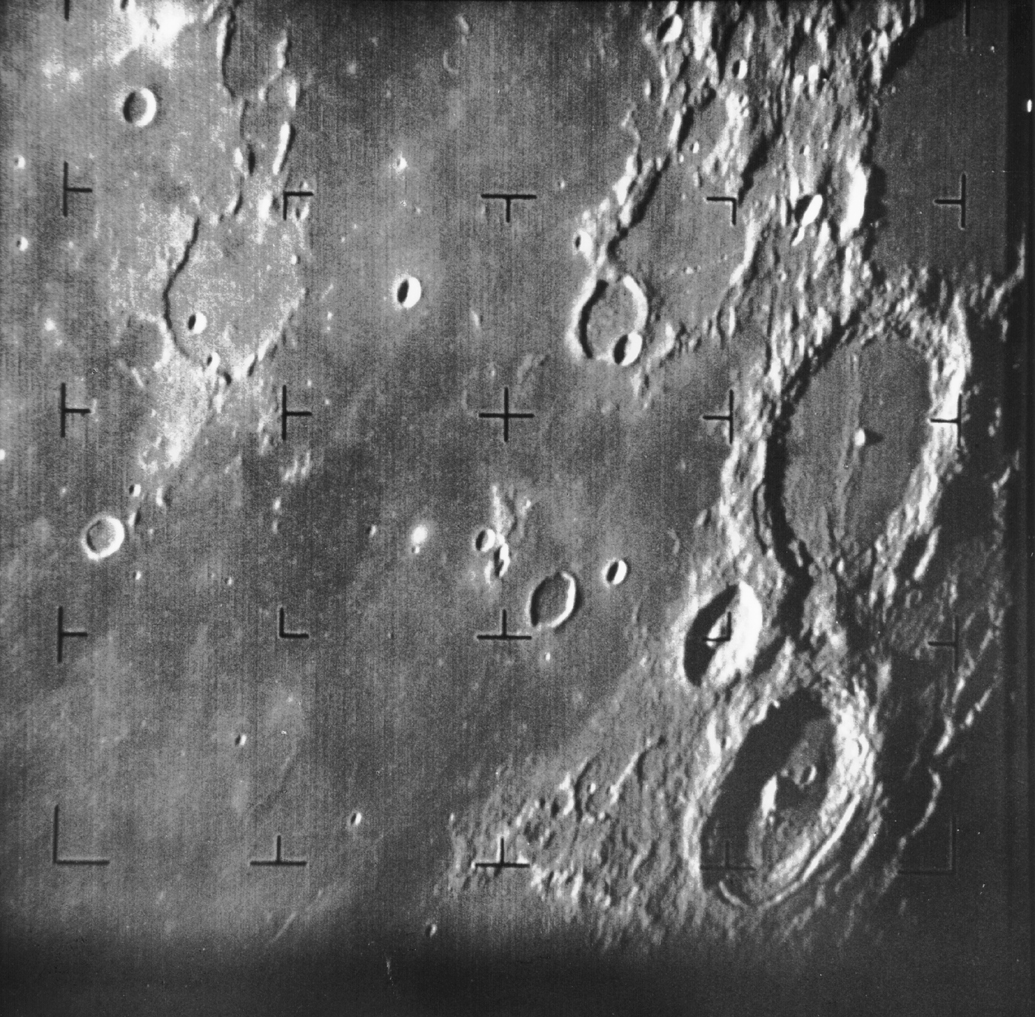
July 31, 1964: Ranger 7 sends back first close-up pictures of the Moon

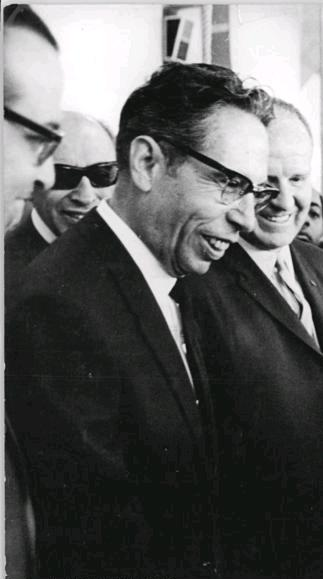
July 5, 1964: Gustavo Díaz Ordaz elected 49th President of Mexico

The following events occurred in July 1964:

== July 1, 1964 (Wednesday) ==
- Field Marshal Mohammad Ayub Khan, president of Pakistan, visited Kabul briefly, where he met King Mohammad Zahir. For the first time in several years, relations between Afghanistan and Pakistan were relatively amicable following the decision of the government of Afghanistan to deal with the Pakhtunistan dispute only through diplomatic negotiations, and to carry on normal relations with Pakistan in other respects.
- In an event at the Bislett stadium in Oslo, Norwegian athlete Terje Pedersen broke the Men's javelin world record. Pedersen's throw of 285 feet 10 inches (87.12 m) broke the record of 284 feet 7 inches (86.74 m) set by Carlo Lievore of Italy on June 1, 1961.
- Clemson Agricultural College of South Carolina adopted its current name, Clemson University.
- Born: Bernard Laporte, French rugby union player and head coach of the French national team from 1999 to 2007; in Rodez, Aveyron
- Died: Pierre Monteux, 85, French-born musical conductor

== July 2, 1964 (Thursday) ==
- U.S. President Lyndon Johnson signed the Civil Rights Act of 1964 into law, abolishing racial segregation in the United States in public schools, public accommodations and travel, and in voting registration. The move came hours after the U.S. House of Representatives voted 289 to 126 to approve the bill as amended by the U.S. Senate. Of the 126 against, 91 were Democrats (88 from the Deep South) and 35 were Republicans. Charles L. Weltner of Georgia was the only southern Democrat to vote for the bill, saying, "We must not remain forever bound to another lost cause." The law took effect at 6:45 in the evening Eastern time when President Johnson signed the bill at a White House ceremony in the East Room, commenting that "Years ago I realized a sad truth. To the extent that black people were imprisoned by racial segregation, so was I."
- After watching the signing of the bill on national television, two African-American men in Jacksonville, Florida, became the first to put the desegregation law to a test. Robert Ingraham and Prince McIntosh "went to a cafeteria where they previously had been arrested when they previously sought service" and were asked "May I help you?" by a white employee behind the counter. The manager of the Morrison's Cafeteria told a reporter, "We decided to go along and obey the law of the land. There were no incidents."
- The National Labor Relations Board decertified the Independent Metal Workers Union as a collective bargaining agent for the Hughes Tool Company (and effectively for any other companies whose employees were members of the IMWU) because of the union's policy of racial segregation and because the union "had failed to fairly represent all workers at the company and systematically discriminated against African Americans" on matters of wages and benefits.
- Born: Jose Canseco, Cuban-born American major league baseball player from 1985 to 2001 who was twice the home run leader (in 1988 and 1991), along with his twin brother, MLB player Ozzie Canseco; in Havana
- Died: Glen "Fireball" Roberts, 35, American stock car racing driver; of injuries and burns sustained in a crash during the World 600, nearly six weeks earlier on May 24.

== July 3, 1964 (Friday) ==
- A group of demonstrators, organized by pacifist David Dellinger, stood outside the White House and conducted the first American public protest against U.S. involvement in the Vietnam War.
- On the day after the passing of the Civil Rights Act in the United States:
  - Two 12-year-old African American girls in Bogalusa, Louisiana, sat down at the lunch counter in the local Woolworth department store, which had previously been able to limit sit-down service to white people. Despite protests by a group of white customers, the two children were served.
  - Georgia politician Lester Maddox, a future governor of Georgia, along with white customers carrying axe handles, forced three African-Americans out of Maddox's Pickrick restaurant in Atlanta. The U.S. Department of Justice would join in a lawsuit filed by the three men. Maddox would later be elected.
  - The French Quarter of New Orleans quietly integrated, along with most other public accommodations in the city with "near total compliance.
- Military Assistance Command, Vietnam (MACV), under the command of U.S. Army General Paul D. Harkins, sent a request to Admiral U. S. Grant Sharp Jr., CINCPAC (Commander-in-Chief, Pacific) asking authorization for a patrol of the Gulf of Tonkin to get information about North Vietnam's coastal defense. Admiral Sharp would dispatch the destroyer USS Maddox (DD-731) to the area, leading to the first Gulf of Tonkin incident on August 2.
- Fifteen of the 49 crewmen of the Spanish tanker MV Bonifaz were killed when their ship collided with the French ship MV Fabiola off Cape Finisterre in a fog. The Bonfiaz caught fire and sank. Six of her 50 crew were rescued by the West German ship MV Sloman Malaga. Bonifaz was also carrying six passengers. The Dutch ship MV Setas picked up 22 crew and three passengers. Four of the crew would subsequently die of their injuries.

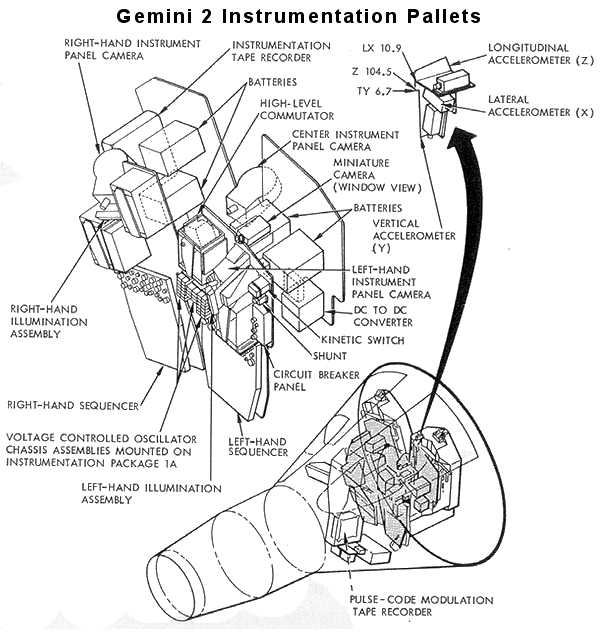
Instrumentation pallets installed in place of astronauts on Gemini SC-2

- Following the successful mating of its modules, Gemini spacecraft No. 2 began the second phase of Spacecraft Systems Tests (SST) at McDonnell. SST continued through September 1964.
- Four Black Muslim inmates at Stateville Prison in Illinois began an uprising in the wake of the June 22 decision in Cooper v. Pate.

== July 4, 1964 (Saturday) ==
- The Rhodesian Bush War started. It would last more than 15 years until the white minority government of Rhodesia relinquished control of the southern African nation to the black majority, began in the first violent attack by the Zimbabwe African National Liberation Army (ZANLA) against a white target. Petrus Oberholzer, a white farmer, was ambushed and murdered near Umtali.
- The Universal City Tour, where paying customers were driven around the backlot of Universal Pictures movie studio in special trams, was inaugurated after a $4,000,000 renovation of the California location. The tour and its concession stands were the original features of what would become the Universal Studios Hollywood theme park.
- Viet Cong guerrillas attacked an American training camp in South Vietnam at Polei Krong, in an action apparently timed to coincide with the American 4th of July holiday.
- George Wallace, governor of the U.S. state of Alabama, condemned the Civil Rights Act of 1964 in a speech, claiming that it would threaten individual liberty, free enterprise and private property rights and added, "The liberal left-wingers have passed it. Now let them employ some pinknik social engineers in Washington, D.C., to figure out what to do with it." Coming two days after the Civil Rights Act became law, the Wallace rally included Mississippi governor Ross Barnett, became violent when members of the Student Nonviolent Coordinating Committee (SNCC) began booing and were attacked by angry audience members. The negative publicity was such that Wallace, who had done better than expected in northern states in the 1964 presidential primaries, would withdraw from the race for the Democratic Party nomination on July 19.
- The Beach Boys' "I Get Around" reached number one on the U.S. Billboard magazine chart of best-selling songs.
- Born:
  - Edi Rama, Prime Minister of Albania since 2013; in Tirana
  - Elie Saab, Lebanese fashion designer; in Beirut
- Died: Hank Sylvern, 56, American composer of radio theme songs

== July 5, 1964 (Sunday) ==
- In the 1964 elections in Mexico, Gustavo Díaz Ordaz was elected President without significant opposition. Diaz, of the ruling Partido Revolucionario Institucional (PRI) received 8,368,446 votes, or 88% of those cast, while his opponent, José González Torres of the Partido Acción Nacional (PAN), got 1,034,337. In addition, the PRI won all 64 seats in the Mexican Senate, and 175 of the 210 seats in the Chamber of Deputies. PAN won 20 seats, the Popular Socialist Party 10, and the Authentic Party got five.
- For the first time in the 20th century, hotels in the U.S. state of Mississippi were integrated and admitted African-American guests. In the state capital at Jackson, the Heidelberg Hotel, the King Edward Hotel, and the Sun-n-Sand Motor Hotel accepted 14 members of the NAACP.
- The Sunday Times linked mercenaries, involved in the North Yemen Civil War, to former RAF pilot Tony Boyle.
- Died: Turkish Army Colonel Talat Aydemir, 47, was hanged after two attempted coups d'etat in 1962 and 1963. His collaborator, Fethi Gürcan, had been put to death on June 27.

== July 6, 1964 (Monday) ==
- The African nation of Malawi, formerly the British protectorate of Nyasaland, received its independence from the United Kingdom one minute after midnight. At Blantyre, the national capital, Prince Philip of the United Kingdom and representatives of other 80 other nations watched the hoisting of the new red, green and black Malawian flag after the Union Jack had been lowered a minute before midnight. Hastings Kamuzu Banda continued as Prime Minister, and the former Nyasaland governor, Sir Glyn Smallwood Jones, became the first (and last) Governor-General of Malawi. In 1966, Banda would become the first President of Malawi.
- The Battle of Nam Dong in the Vietnam War began at 2:26 in the morning in South Vietnam when an 800-man contingent of the Viet Cong began firing mortar rounds at a South Vietnamese Army (ARVN) camp at Nam Dong, near South Vietnam's border with Laos. The outnumbered group of 311 ARVN soldiers, along with 12 members of the U.S. Army Special Forces (the Green Berets) and one Australian adviser, defended the camp for ninety minutes until air support could arrive. When the battle ended by dawn, 53 South Vietnamese, two Americans and the Australian, Kevin Conway, were dead. Of the ARVN force and the 13 supplemental troops; 65 were wounded, including U.S. Army Captain Roger Donlon, who would be awarded the Medal of Honor for annihilating an enemy demolition team, dragging wounded men to safety, and directing the defenders despite multiple shrapnel wounds.
- Demanihi Tepa of Tahiti was rescued alive after 155 days drifting in a boat across the South Pacific Ocean. Tepa and his friend, Natua Faioho, had set off from the island of Maupiti on February 2 on what was supposed to be a short trip to the island of Bora Bora, but the outboard motor had broken down. The boat drifted more than 1,400 miles (2,300 km) westward over the next five months. Two weeks after Faioho died, Tepa's boat washed ashore on the island of Ta‘ū, part of American Samoa.
- The Beatles' first feature film, A Hard Day's Night, premiered in the United Kingdom before 1200 ticketholders at the London Pavilion. It would be released in the United States on August 11. The movie soundtrack would be released on July 10 in the UK.
- An early morning earthquake killed 31 people in villages in the Mexican state of Guerrero.
- The first design review of the Project Gemini extravehicular life support system chest pack began and would last until July 12. Manned Spacecraft Center conditionally approved the AiResearch basic design but recommended certain changes.
- Died: Zeng Junchen, 75, Chinese philanthropist and opium merchant

== July 7, 1964 (Tuesday) ==
- In Biloxi, Mississippi, U.S. District Judge Sidney Mize ordered the first integration of public schools anywhere in the state, directing the school districts in Biloxi, Jackson and Leake County to desegregate starting with the 1964–1965 school year.
- An avalanche, on Mont Blanc in the French Alps, killed 14 mountain climbers, including former world champion slalom skier Charles Bozon, 31.
- The National League won the 35th Major League Baseball All-Star Game at Shea Stadium.
- The 14th Berlin International Film Festival ended.
- Ram Kishan became Chief Minister of Punjab.
- Died: Lillian Copeland, 59, American track and field athlete, 1932 Olympic gold medalist in the women's discus throw

== July 8, 1964 (Wednesday) ==
- Peace negotiations regarding the future of Cyprus began in Geneva between representatives of Greece and Turkey. United Nations mediator Sakari Tuomioja, the former Prime Minister of Finland, moderated the talks, and former U.S. Secretary of State Dean Acheson served as mediator, but no representative from Cyprus was present to appear for either the Greek-speaking or Turkish-speaking Cypriots.
- In Haiti, that nation's secret police force, the Tonton Macoutes, arrested Joe Gaetjens, a Haitian soccer football player who had been on the U.S. National Team in the 1950 World Cup, who was never seen in public again. Gaetjens, whose family opposed the dictatorship of Francois Duvalier, was taken to the prison at Fort Dimanche, tortured and, presumably, killed.
- A U.S. Department of Defense spokesman announced that American casualties in Vietnam had risen to 1387 "since American forces became fully involved in the jungle war in 1961", a number broken down as "152 killed in action, 96 deaths not related to combat, 971 wounded in action, 151 non-battle injuries and 17 missing in action."
- After two previous failures, the United States Air Force successfully launched the much maligned and oft-troubled Athena missile from the Green River Launch Complex in Utah on a 475-mile (764 km) shot to the White Sands Missile Range in New Mexico.

== July 9, 1964 (Thursday) ==
- In Alabama, Circuit Judge James Hare issued "an injunction that almost destroyed Alabama's civil rights movement", prohibiting members of organizations favoring or opposing civil rights from gathering together. Specifically named in the order were the NAACP, the Student Nonviolent Coordinating Committee, the Southern Christian Leadership Conference, the Dallas County Voters League (in Selma, Alabama), as well as various Ku Klux Klan groups and the American Nazi Party. Forty-one civil rights leaders were specifically named, including Martin Luther King Jr. of the SCLC and John Lewis of the SNCC. Under the order, if three or more people from the named organizations, or the specific individuals, gathered together, they would be subject to arrest and jail for contempt of court, with enforcement at the discretion of local law enforcement. "Hare's injunction was ruinous," a historian would later note. "Mass meetings and rallies disappeared in Alabama and voter applications declined to their lowest number in years." Daniel H. Thomas, the federal judge whose district included Judge Hare's circuit, would delay a ruling on a motion to dismiss the injunction until 1965.
- Francis Russell, a historian, announced that he had found 250 love letters that had been written by Warren G. Harding and said that they were the first confirmation of speculation that Harding, the 29th President of the United States, had had an extramarital affair prior to taking office. The letters and postcards, written by Harding to Carrie Fulton Phillips between 1905 and 1920, had been found in a locked closet at Mrs. Phillips' home in Marion, Ohio, after her death in 1960. One of the last letters showed that Mrs. Phillips had demanded $5000 a year in a blackmail scheme. Harding's heirs would sue to prevent the release of the letters, or their description in Russell's upcoming biography of Harding. In 1971, the suit would be settled with the provision that the letters would be presented, under seal, to the Library of Congress, and not to be released until July 29, 2014.
- All 39 people on board United Airlines Flight 823 were killed after an uncontrollable fire broke out inside the Viscount turbo-jet, which crashed two miles northeast of Parrottsville, Tennessee. The plane had originated in Philadelphia and was on its way to a stop in Knoxville with a final destination in Huntsville, Alabama with 35 passengers and a crew of four. The fire had originated below the passenger floor and eventually entered the passenger cabin. One passenger attempted to abandon the aircraft through an escape window prior to impact but did not survive the free-fall. The fire eventually burned through the cockpit and it was likely the crew was unconscious by that time. The exact cause of the fire remains unknown.
- Ahmed bin Abdullah, the Sultan of Fadhli on the Gulf of Aden, was deposed by a vote of the Supreme Council of the Federation of South Arabia for attempting to pull Fadhli out of membership in the British-protected federation. On July 11, the Federation Council would elect his brother, Nasser bin Abdullah as his successor. Three years later, Britain would withdraw from the Aden region and all of the sultanates within the South Arabian Federation would be abolished.
- Born: Courtney Love (stage name for Courtney Michelle Harrison), American singer, actress, and widow of Kurt Cobain; in San Francisco

== July 10, 1964 (Friday) ==
- The Parliament of France approved a reorganization of its national subdivisions to take effect in 1968, with the increase in the number of départements of metropolitan France from 90 to 95. The two départements around Paris and its metro area were divided, to be replaced by seven new départements over the next four years. Seine (governed by Paris) was split into the new départements of Paris and Seine-Saint-Denis, while Seine-et-Oise (governed from Versailles) was split into Essonne, Val-d'Oise, and Yvelines. Parts of both the old départements were used to create Hauts-de-Seine and Val-de-Marne.
- NASA's Gemini Program Office announced the tentative plans for the first four crewed Gemini-Titan (GT) missions, which would be the first American spaceflights to use two astronauts. Gemini 4 would be a four-day mission using battery power. Gemini 5 would include radar and a rendezvous evaluation pod for rendezvous exercises early in the flight, and last up to seven days, contingent upon the availability of fuel cells. Gemini 6 would be a standard rendezvous mission of perhaps two days, while Gemini 7 would be the longest American crewed mission, lasting potentially of 14 days.
- An anti-war petition, circulated by the National Committee for a Sane Nuclear Policy, and signed by more than 5,000 university and college professors, was presented to the U.S. Department of State for delivery to President Johnson, asking that the United States not enlarge its involvement in the Vietnam War and proposing international mediation to declare North Vietnam and South Vietnam neutral. "The administration was not listening," a historian would note later, and would send more than 5000 American troops before the end of the month.
- Despite having once led an attempt to secede from the former Belgian Congo, Moïse Tshombe was named as the new Congolese Prime Minister by his former enemy, President Joseph Kasavubu, who fired Premier Cyrille Adoula, who fled into exile. Tshombe, brought in to halt a mutiny in the Katanga region, would serve for more than a year, until President Kasavubu dismissed him on October 13, 1965. Tshombe's first act was to order several thousand Katangese gendarmes to come back to the Congo in order to receive amnesty.
- Golfer Tony Lema won the British Open at the Old Course at St Andrews in St Andrews, Scotland. He finished five strokes ahead of runner-up Jack Nicklaus. It was Lema's only major championship win; he would be killed in a plane crash two years later, on July 24, 1966.

== July 11, 1964 (Saturday) ==
- Nine spectators were killed, and 14 more injured, while they were watching the 19th stage of the Tour de France, when a police truck crashed into them. The victims were standing along a bridge at the village of Port-de-Couze within the commune of Lalinde; three of them were children. What was "the worst disaster in the 61-year-old history of the annual classic" happened in the departement of Dordogne when the brakes failed on the truck. The driver jumped free, and the vehicle plowed into the crowd. Enraged residents attempted to lynch the driver, before he was rescued by other police officers.
- Judge Joseph Sam Perry declared a mistrial in the trial for bribery of U.S. Secret Service agent Abraham Bolden.
- Lemuel A. Penn, an African-American who was the Assistant Superintendent of the Washington, D.C., public schools and a Lieutenant Colonel in the United States Army Reserve, was shot and killed while on his way back to Washington from annual training in Fort Benning, Georgia. As his car approached Colbert, Georgia, on state highway 172, Penn was shot by two Klansmen who passed his car. The two men, Howard Sims and Cecil Myers, would be acquitted of murder by an all-white jury in spite of a signed confession. In 1966, the two killers would become the first people tried in federal court under the new Civil Rights Act of 1964 for the crime of violating a person's civil rights. Each would serve six years in prison for the killing.
- British driver Jim Clark won the 1964 British Grand Prix at Brands Hatch.
- Born: Kyril, Prince of Preslav, son of the former Tsar Simeon II of Bulgaria; in Madrid, Spain

== July 12, 1964 (Sunday) ==
- Accidental poisoning killed 22 people, and made 128 seriously ill, at a banquet following a memorial service in the Greek village of Stylia, 40 miles (64 km) from the city of Patras. The victims were attending a mnemósynon, an orthodox memorial service for the late Grigorios Apostolopoulos, and were served koliva, a traditional food associated with the service. The widow had accidentally put a powdered insecticide on the dish of wheat and raisins while preparing it, after having mistaken it for powdered sugar.
- Mickey Wright earned her fourth and final U.S. Women's Open golf title, defeating Ruth Jessen in an 18-hole playoff.
- The French comic strip Gai-Luron, created by Gotlib, appeared in print for the first time.
- Mauritania established diplomatic relations with the Soviet Union.

== July 13, 1964 (Monday) ==
- Appeals by Lennie Field and the unrelated Brian Field, implicated in the previous year's Great Train Robbery, against the charges of conspiracy to rob were allowed by a British court. Their sentences were thus effectively reduced to five years. The next day, the court allowed appeals by Roger Cordrey and Bill Boal and quashed their convictions for conspiracy to rob, leaving only the charges of receiving stolen property. Justice Fenton Atkinson concluded that a miscarriage of justice would result if Boal's charges were upheld, given that his age, physique and temperament made him an unlikely train robber. Cordrey would also be later deemed to be innocent of the conspiracy because his prints were not found at Leatherslade Farm.
- Died:
  - Joel Brand, 58, Romanian-born German member of the Hungarian Aid and Rescue Committee; of liver disease
  - Stephen Galatti, 75, Director General of the American Field Service since 1939

== July 14, 1964 (Tuesday) ==
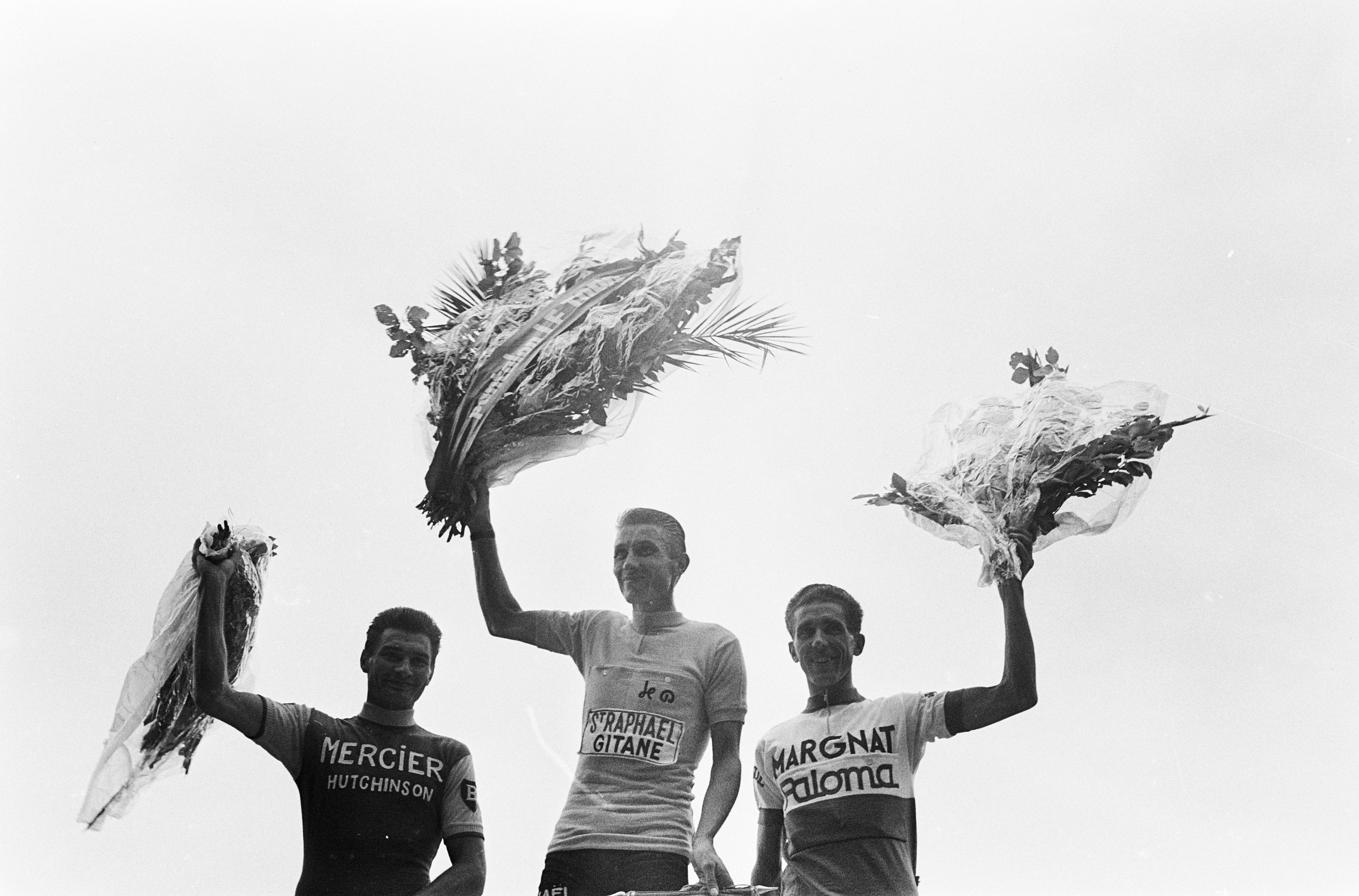
Tour winner Anquetil (center)

- Jacques Anquetil won the Tour de France for the fifth time, for his fourth championship in a row. Anquetil outsprinted Raymond Poulidor on the final stage of the 2,719-mile (4,376 km) bicycle race, arriving at the Parc des Princes Stadium in Paris after his departure from Versailles. Anquetil's lead over Poulidor had narrowed to only 14 seconds by the 20th stage on Sunday, and he would win the race by only 55 seconds overall.
- The first ever Operation Sail (OpSail) was held off the coast of New York in conjunction with the 1964 World's Fair, with a race between 11 Class A tall ships, and another race with 12 Class B ships. The event would be held on five other occasions: 1976 to celebrate the American bicentennial; 1986 to commemorate the centennial of the Statue of Liberty; 1992 for the 500th anniversary of the voyage of Christopher Columbus; 2000 for the Millennium Celebration; and 2012 for the bicentennial of the War of 1812 and the Star Spangled Banner.
- Abdul Salam Arif, the President of Iraq, announced that all of the Middle Eastern republic's political parties would be merged into one legal organization, the Iraqi Arab Socialist Union. At the same time, President Arif announced the nationalization of all banks and insurance companies, and 32 other industrial concerns. The Bank of the Middle East (a British bank) and the Eastern Bank were taken over, leaving the government-operated Rafidain Bank, and banks devoted to industry, agriculture, estates and mortgages.
- A study submitted to NASA by Douglas Aircraft Company concluded that a six-person space research station, capable of orbiting for one year, could be orbiting the Earth within five years. The crew, serving on a staggered schedule, would travel to and from the station on modified Gemini or Apollo spacecraft. The station would provide a small degree of artificial gravity by rotating slowly and would include a centrifuge to simulate reentry forces.
- Mao Zedong, the Chairman of the Chinese Communist Party and de facto leader of the People's Republic of China, authorized the publication of an essay in the Party journal Red Flag. The treatise, "On Khrushchev's Phony Communism and Historical Lessons for the World", faulted the Soviet Union for its "revisionist" policies and urged a reform that contained the justification for what would turn out to be the Cultural Revolution.
- At Geneva, American moderator Dean Acheson submitted a six-point peace proposal that would have allowed Cyprus to become part of Greece, with the exception of the Karpass Peninsula at the far eastern part of the island, which would become part of Turkey.

== July 15, 1964 (Wednesday) ==
- Leonid Brezhnev stepped down from the ceremonial job of head of state of the Soviet Union at the request of Prime Minister and Communist Party First Secretary Nikita Khrushchev, who explained to the 1,443 members of the USSR Parliament, the Supreme Soviet, that Brezhnev needed to devote full time to Party matters. The Supreme Soviet voted unanimously to accept Brezhnev's resignation and then, three minutes later, voted unanimously to approve Khrushchev's recommendation to elect first deputy premier Anastas Mikoyan as the new President. The shuffling of positions led Western observers to conclude that Brezhnev was being prepared as Khrushchev's eventual successor, something which would happen three months later.
- The "topping out" ceremony was held to mark the completion of what was, at the time, the tallest building in the United Kingdom, the Post Office Tower (officially, the British Telecommunications Tower or BT Tower) in London. It would not begin operation until October 8, 1965. With 34 floors, the main structure is 177 metres (581 ft) high; including antennae on the top, it is 191 metres (627 ft). It would be exceeded two years later by a taller BT Tower in Birmingham; the tallest building in the UK now is The Shard, 95 stories and 310 metres (1,017 ft).
- U.S. Senator Barry Goldwater of Arizona received 883 delegate votes on the first ballot of the Republican National Convention in San Francisco to become the Republican Party's nominee for President of the United States. Goldwater's chief challenger, Governor William Scranton of Pennsylvania, received 214 votes, and other candidates combined got 211. Other candidates getting votes were Nelson Rockefeller (114); George Romney (41); Margaret Chase Smith (27); Walter Judd (22); Hiram Fong (5); and Henry Cabot Lodge Jr. (2).
- Dr. Sam Sheppard who had been serving a life sentence in prison after being convicted in 1954 of the murder of his wife, was ordered released after ten years with the posting of $10,000 bail. U.S. District Judge Carl Weinman of Dayton, Ohio held that Sheppard's trial for murder had been a "mockery of justice" and that the doctor had been denied his constitutional right to a fair proceeding. Judge Weinman directed that Ohio authorities had 60 days to determine whether to try Dr. Sheppard again.
- An explosion killed 18 firemen in Tokyo while they were fighting a blaze in warehouses along the Tokyo harbor. The city sent 1,500 firefighters and 180 fire engines to combat the spread of the fire, and the effort had gone on for more than three hours when the flames set off a stockpile of nitrocellulose. The blast injured 46 other people in the area, including reporters, cameramen, nearby residents and other firefighters.
- Intermetall, an international organization to coordinate the quality and quantity of iron and steel production in the Communist nations of Eastern Europe, was founded by agreement of Czechoslovakia, Hungary and Poland. By the end of the year, the Soviet Union, Bulgaria and East Germany would become party to the agreement as well.
- The European Court of Justice issued a landmark decision, Costa v ENEL, holding that for the six member nations of the European Communities (France, West Germany, Italy, Belgium, the Netherlands, and Luxembourg) Community law had to be given precedence over individual national laws if the two conflicted.
- Born: Tetsuji Hashiratani, Japanese footballer with 72 caps for the Japan national football team; in Kyoto

== July 16, 1964 (Thursday) ==
- Accepting his party's nomination at the 1964 Republican National Convention, U.S. Senator Barry Goldwater rejected criticisms that his conservative views were too extreme to win the upcoming presidential election and made the statement for which he would be most remembered. "I would remind you," Senator Goldwater told the delegates and a national television audience, "that extremism in the defense of liberty is no vice." He added, "And let me remind you also that 'moderation in the pursuit of justice is no virtue'". Prior to Goldwater's keynote address, convention delegates approved his pick of an obscure U.S. Representative, William E. Miller of New York, as the nominee for Vice-President of the United States, marking the first time that the Republican Party had nominated someone of the Roman Catholic faith for national office.
- The SNCC held "Freedom Day" proceedings throughout Mississippi as part of the Freedom Summer project to transport African-Americans to the courthouse to register to vote, under the protection of the new Civil Rights Act. In Greenwood, the police chief told marchers, "You are free to go and register. No one will interfere with you if you want to stand here and register but we will not allow any picketing." After giving picketers two minutes to disperse, city police began arrests. In Greenville and Cleveland, registration and picketing proceeded without interference. By August 2, United Press International would report that more than 500,000 African-American citizens had been added to the voter registration list.
- On July 16 and 17, Flight Crew Support Division objected to McDonnell procedures for conducting Gemini ejection seat sled tests because they were not adequate to give confidence in human use of the seats. The dummies were being rigged with extreme restraint-harness tensions and highly torqued joints which could not be achieved with human subjects. McDonnell was requested to review the situation and prepare a report for Gemini Program Office.
- The African-American section of New York City, was triggered after NYPD officer Thomas Gilligan shot and killed a 15-year-old boy, James Powell, causing a riot in Harlem. Two days later, the NYPD response to protests would lead to the outbreak of rioting.
- Born:
  - Phil Hellmuth, American professional poker player and 14-time participant in the World Series of Poker and 1989 Series champion; in Madison, Wisconsin
  - Miguel Indurain, Spanish cyclist and five-time consecutive Tour de France winner (1991 to 1995); in Villava
- Died: Alfred Junge, 78, German-born British film production designer

== July 17, 1964 (Friday) ==
- Subscription Television (STV) telecast its first major league baseball game as a closed-circuit cable network available to anyone in California willing to pay five dollars to install a converter, one dollar a month for the service, and $1.50 for a televised Los Angeles Dodgers or San Francisco Giants home game. The first offering was a Dodgers game, a 3–2 win over the visiting Chicago Cubs and "the first color baseball telecast ever seen in Southern California". Frank Sims called the action, and Fresco Thompson provided the commentary. Unfortunately for STV, movie theater owners and television networks objected and, in November, voters would vote in favor of Proposition 15 to ban pay television.
- The combination of a minor earthquake in the Sea of Japan near the Niigata Prefecture was followed by torrential rains that crumbled structures and hillsides that had been weakened by the quake. Nearly 150 bridges collapsed and dikes cracked in 200 different places. By the end of the next day, 108 people were killed, 233 were injured and over 44,000 were homeless.
- Donald Campbell, son of the great British record-breaker Malcolm Campbell and driver of the Bluebird CN7, made his last attempt at the land speed record. His speed, 403.10 mph (648.73 km/h), was less than the unratified speed of the controversial Spirit of America.
- Born:
  - Craig Morgan (stage name for Craig Morgan Greer), American country music singer; in Kingston Springs, Tennessee
  - Hajime Kanzaka, Japanese novelist and manga story writer; in Asago, Hyōgo Prefecture
  - Heather Langenkamp, American film actress; in Tulsa, Oklahoma

== July 18, 1964 (Saturday) ==
- Six days of rioting began in Harlem when a crowd of 4,000 protesters assembled outside the Harlem precinct police station to demonstrate against police brutality and the shooting of teenager James Powell. When the protest leaders were arrested by NYPD officers, other members of the crowd began throwing bricks and Molotov cocktails at the station, and others began vandalizing and looting neighborhood businesses and office buildings. Over the next six days, 140 people were injured and one died; 520 people were arrested; and over 500 structures were destroyed. The outbreak was followed, for the first time in the United States in the 20th Century, by a "chain reaction of riots" that would strike seven other major American cities for the next six weeks "before ending in Philadelphia on the last day of August."
- Judith Graham Pool published her discovery of cryoprecipitate, a frozen blood clotting product made from plasma primarily to treat hemophiliacs around the world. The paper, "High Potency Antihemophiliac Concentrate Prepared from Cryoglobulin Precipitate", appeared in the 18 July issue of Nature.
- Siw Malmkvist became the first singer from Sweden to have a hit on the U.S. Billboard chart. Her song "Sole Sole Sole" would reach number 58 on Billboard's "Hot 100" chart. The same year, she had a #1 hit in West Germany with "Liebeskummer lohnt sich nicht" ("Lovesick Isn't Worth It").
- "False Hare" was released as the last Bugs Bunny cartoon (until 1991), the final Warner Bros. cartoon to use "The Merry-Go-Round Broke Down" as its theme, and the last to feature the "target".
- The Beatles' single "A Hard Day's Night" entered the UK chart, a fortnight after the release of the film of the same name.

== July 19, 1964 (Sunday) ==
- Soviet Premier Nikita Khrushchev gave a speech indicating, for the first time, that Soviet dictator Joseph Stalin had been poisoned in 1953 by Internal Affairs Minister Lavrenti Beria, who was later executed. According to one historian, Leonid Brezhnev and his allies within the Politburo were alarmed by the statement, which came during a reception in Moscow for visiting Hungarian leader János Kádár, and "decided that in revealing Kremlin secrets Khrushchev was behaving irrationally and that he should be removed from power."
- Alabama Governor George C. Wallace abandoned his bid to become a third-party candidate in the 1964 U.S. presidential election, and declined to support either President Johnson or Republican challenger Goldwater. The day before, Wallace had gotten on to the ballot in North Carolina as a candidate for the Constitution Party, after qualifying to run in Alabama and Louisiana, and said that he would stand as a candidate in 16 states altogether.
- Zond 1, the Soviet space probe launched on April 2 for a flyby of the planet Venus, passed within 96,500 kilometres (60,000 mi) of that planet, but no data could be received because of a failure of its transmitters in May and in June. Because of the failure of the second component of Zond 1, no further trajectory corrections could be received after June.
- At a rally in Saigon, South Vietnam's Prime Minister Nguyen Khanh called for an expansion of the war into North Vietnam. Before a crowd of 100,000 people, General Khanh led the rallying cry "Bac thien!" ("To the North!") and called on volunteers not only to defend South Vietnam, but to liberate North Vietnam.
- China launched its first biomedical rocket, placing four white rats, four white mice and 12 test tubes of fruit flies in the nose cone of one of its T-7 rockets. The rocket traveled into the mesosphere, reaching an altitude of 70 kilometres (43 mi), while films were taken of the animals' reaction.
- Born:
  - Teresa Edwards, American women's basketball player in the ABL and WNBA professional leagues between 1996 and 2004 and four-time Olympic gold medalist (1984, 1988, 1996 and 2000); in Cairo, Georgia
  - Masahiko Kondō, Japanese singer, race car driver and actor; in Yokohama

== July 20, 1964 (Monday) ==
- Ion propulsion was used for the first time in a space launch into Earth orbit, as SERT-1 (the Space Electric Rocket Test) was sent up by NASA's the Wallops Island facility, off the coast of Virginia, by a Scout rocket.
- In Colombia, guerrilla leader Manuel Marulanda, nicknamed "Tirofijo", chose the South American nation's independence day to proclaim the manifesto of his organization, the Bloque Sur, with the adoption of seven goals that formed what called the National Agrarian Policy. In addition to the division of large farm estates and their redistribution to the peasant sharecroppers who worked on them, the manifesto also promised peasants credit, seeds and technical advice on farming, and pledged that Colombia's indigenous peoples would be able to observe their traditions on their ancestral lands.
- The National Movement of the Revolution was instituted as the sole legal political party in the Republic of Congo.
- Born:
  - Chris Cornell, American grunge rock musician, frontman and lead vocalist of Soundgarden and Audioslave; as Christopher John Boyle in Seattle (committed suicide, 2017)
  - Terri Irwin, American-Australian conservationist, naturalist, and television personality and widow of Steve Irwin; as Terri Raines in Eugene, Oregon

== July 21, 1964 (Tuesday) ==
- Commenting on Republican Presidential candidate Barry Goldwater's views on the space program, Warren Burkett, science writer for the Houston Chronicle, observed that a great deal of research being conducted as part of NASA's Apollo program could be of direct value to the military services. Burkett contended that an orbital laboratory using Apollo-developed components could be used for such military applications as patrol and orbital interception. He suggested that, with Apollo, NASA was generating an inventory of "off-the-shelf" space hardware suitable for military use if needed.
- A race riot began in Singapore between ethnic Chinese and Malays. To celebrate the traditional day marking the birthday of the Muhammad, a crowd of 20,000 Moslem Malay residents marched in a parade. At about 5:00 p.m., some of the younger marchers began to leave the procession, and a Chinese Singaporean policeman told them (in the Malay language) to return. A crowd of Malay Singaporeans surrounded the officer, and when more police arrived to assist, they were attacked by 50 of the Malays. Over the next three days, 23 people were killed and 454 injured.
- Meeting in the capital of Egypt, representatives of the member nations of the Organisation of African Unity signed the Cairo Declaration, effectively recognizing the 19th-century colonial division of Africa by pledging to respect "the borders existing on the achievement of national independence."
- Born: Ross Kemp, English journalist and former daytime television actor; in Barking, Essex
- Died:
  - Paddy McLogan, 65, Northern Irish politician and activist, Leader of Sinn Féin political party between 1950 and 1962, was found dead in the garden of his home in Blanchardstown, the victim of a gunshot wound to the head. His Walther 9mm pistol was found by his side, along with a spent cartridge; a coroner's inquest concluded that the cause of death was an accident resulting from falling while carrying a loaded weapon, rather than a suicide or a homicide.
  - John White, 27, Scottish soccer football player for Tottenham Hotspur and for the Scottish national team, was killed when he was struck by lightning while playing a round of golf at the Crews Hill golf course outside London.

== July 22, 1964 (Wednesday) ==
- The U.S. Air Force made its first successful test of the uncrewed glider ASSET (Aerothermodynamic Elastic Structural Systems Environmental Tests) "in the preview of the way future explorers will return to the earth". The outside of the arrow-shaped craft reached temperatures of 2,200 °C (4,000 °F) as it reached a speed of 19,000 kilometres (12,000 mi) per hour during its glide down to the ocean from an altitude of 70 kilometres (43 mi).
- Representatives of Iran, Pakistan and Turkey issued a joint statement from Istanbul, establishing the RCD (Regional Cooperation for Development).
- Born: David Spade, American stand-up comedian and actor; in Birmingham, Michigan

== July 23, 1964 (Thursday) ==
- In Boardman, Ohio, a suburb of Youngstown, brothers Forrest Raffel and Leroy Raffel opened the first Arby's fast food restaurant. According to the company's history, the operators of the restaurant supply company Raffel Brothers, Inc., originally wanted to call the chain "Big Tex", but were unsuccessful in negotiating with the Akron businessman who owned the rights to the name. Forrest Raffel would say later, "We came up with Arby’s®, which stands for R.B., the initials of Raffel Brothers, although I guess customers might think the initials stand for roast beef”.
- Four men, who had been feared dead after their motorboat disappeared in the Atlantic Ocean on July 14, were rescued alive by an American merchant ship, the Maiden, after their raft was spotted by a U.S. Navy plane about 420 miles (680 km) off the United States coast. The men, all from Connecticut, had been aboard a yacht, the Gooney Bird, before being forced to abandon ship.
- Three white employees of a plumbing firm in Greenwood, Mississippi, became the first people to be arrested under the new Civil Rights Act, and were criminally charged with violating the civil rights of an African American man when they beat him up for trying to enter a local movie theater.
- Born: Nick Menza, American thrash metal drummer for Megadeth; in Munich, West Germany (died of congestive heart failure during a concert, 2016)
- Died:
  - Arkady Mordvinov, 68, Soviet architect and construction manager
  - Thakin Kodaw Hmaing, 88, Burmese poet and peace activist

== July 24, 1964 (Friday) ==
- U.S. President Johnson and his challenger in the upcoming November presidential election, Barry Goldwater, met in the White House at Goldwater's request, and agreed that both sides should avoid making "racial tensions" (between white and black Americans) an issue in the campaign. According to Goldwater, the two men also agreed that the U.S. policy regarding Vietnam would not be an issue during the campaign either, and both honored the agreement as candidates.
- At a press conference, President Johnson publicly revealed the existence of the Lockheed SR-71 Blackbird spy plane, which he said could fly at three times the speed of sound, at altitudes of more than 80,000 feet (24,000 m) and could "provide worldwide reconnaissance ability" to the United States.
- The Egyptian cargo ship SS Star of Alexandria exploded and sank in the harbor at Annaba, Algeria, killing at least 20 people and injuring at least 165 others.
- Frederick John Harris, a white member of the terrorist group African Resistance Movement, planted a time bomb inside a suitcase which he left at the "whites only" railroad platform at the Johannesburg Park Station in South Africa. The explosion injured 24 people. One of them, 77-year-old Ethel Rhys, would die of her injuries a month later. On April 1, 1965, Harris would be executed.
- A nuclear criticality accident fatally injured Robert Peabody, an employee at the United Nuclear Corporation's facility at Wood River Junction, Rhode Island. According to plant officials, the accident occurred when Peabody poured a solution of enriched uranium from "a geometrically safe container" into a larger container, causing the accidental nuclear fission of uranium atoms. Peabody died two days later.
- Born:
  - Barry Bonds, American Major League Baseball player who holds the record for most home runs in a season (73 in 2001) and most home runs in a career (762); in Riverside, California
  - Pedro Passos Coelho, Prime Minister of Portugal from 2011 to 2015; in Coimbra

== July 25, 1964 (Saturday) ==
- Hanoi Radio charged in a broadcast that American ships had fired upon North Vietnamese fishing craft, making the first assertion of United States aggression against North Vietnam.
- Born: Lisa LaFlamme, Canadian news anchor for CTV National News; in Kitchener, Ontario

== July 26, 1964 (Sunday) ==
- A railway accident killed 94 passengers on the Automara express train in Portugal, near Custóias, when their overcrowded railroad car became uncoupled from the rest of the train, and hurtled down an embankment. The group was returning home to Porto from the beach resort of Póvoa de Varzim, and had only a few minutes left on their trip when disaster struck. The car they were in was supposed to carry no more than 70 people, and more than twice that many (161) had been on board.
- In an apparent retaliation for the bombing of the Johannesburg railroad station three days earlier, a newly constructed refugee center in Francistown in neighboring Bechuanaland (now Botswana) was destroyed by a bomb on the eve of its dedication ceremony. Nobody was injured in the bombing, which was believed to have been carried out by the South African Bureau of State Security, but the building was a total loss.
- Member nations of the Organization of American States, with the exception of Mexico agreed to avoid any trade with Cuba (other than food and medical supplies) in response to Cuban support of guerrilla operations in South America.
- The 1964 Australian Touring Car Championship was won by Ian Geoghegan, the first of his five wins in the event.
- Born: Sandra Bullock, American film actress; in Arlington, Virginia
- Died: William A. Seiter, 74, American film director

== July 27, 1964 (Monday) ==
- Astronauts James A. McDivitt and Edward H. White II were named as command pilot and pilot, respectively, for the Gemini 4 mission scheduled for the first quarter of 1965. The backup crew for the mission would be Frank Borman, command pilot, and James A. Lovell, Jr., pilot. The mission was scheduled for up to four days' duration. At a press conference on July 29 at Manned Spacecraft Center, Deputy Gemini Program Manager Kenneth S. Kleinknecht said that on the second crewed Gemini space flight an astronaut would first be exposed to the hazards of outer space without full spacecraft protection. Although he first said that the experiment would involve "stepping into space," he later modified this by saying that it might involve nothing more than opening a hatch and standing up.
- Sir Winston Churchill attended a meeting of the House of Commons for the last time, 63 years after he had made his first appearance as a Member of Parliament. The 89-year-old, former leader of the Conservative Party and twice Prime Minister of the United Kingdom, would be voted a resolution of thanks the next day, and would pass away six months later.
- The first comic book convention to feature well-known artists was held as a one-day event at the Workman's Circle Building in New York City, after being organized by readers Bernie Bubnis and Ron Fradkin. The New York Comicon attracted 50 people in its first outing.
- The United States made plans to send 5,000 more American troops to South Vietnam, bringing the total number of United States forces in Vietnam to 21,000.
- Died: NYPD Patrolman Henry Walburger, 24, was shot and killed in the line of duty while investigating a burglary in progress call. The NYPD Harbor Unit patrol boat Launch 5 would later be named in Walburger's honor.

== July 28, 1964 (Tuesday) ==
- Sir Winston Churchill retired from the House of Commons at the age of 89 after 64 years as a Member of Parliament. Labour and Liberal MPs joined those of Churchill's Conservative Party in honoring the former Prime Minister of the United Kingdom. A resolution in praise of Churchill was passed unanimously; the only other such honor had been accorded in a vote of thanks to the Duke of Wellington. Prime Minister and fellow Tory Alec Douglas-Home spoke of "the luster the right honourable gentleman, the member for Woodford" had brought to Commons. Opposition Leader and future Prime Minister Harold Wilson, speaking for Labour, said, "In our darkest hour of 1940, Churchill was the choice of the nation"; and Liberal leader Jo Grimond praised Churchill for having led the UK "with immense power, through crisis, without weakening democracy" and former Prime Minister Harold Macmillan said, "He is the greatest member of Parliament of this, or any other age."
- Republican nominee Barry Goldwater challenged his Democratic Party rival, incumbent U.S. President Johnson, to a series of televised presidential debates in the same format as the Kennedy–Nixon debates of 1960. With nothing to gain, President Johnson declined to meet Goldwater on television, and no presidential debates would take place until 1976.
- The destroyer USS Maddox was sent into the Gulf of Tonkin on a mission to conduct surveillance of North Vietnam communications, and would clash with a North Vietnamese ship one week later.
- Ranger 7 was successfully launched toward the Moon from Cape Kennedy in the first successful test of the Atlas rocket.
- Born: Lori Loughlin, American TV actress and producer, known for the series Full House and as the star of the series Summerland, and later as a central figure in the 2019 college admissions bribery scandal; in Queens, New York
- Died:
  - Jules Brévié, 84 and former French colonial administrator who served as Governor General of French West Africa from 1930 to 1936 and then as Governor General of French Indochina from 1936 to 1939.
  - Robert Avnet, 45, President of Avnet Electronics Corporation, committed suicide by jumping from the 8th floor of his apartment building in West Los Angeles.

== July 29, 1964 (Wednesday) ==
- In New York City, "the leaders of the six major Negro organizations in the United States" signed a statement agreeing to "a broad curtailment, if not total moratorium, on all mass marches, mass picketing, and mass demonstrations until after election day, next November 3" and to concentrate instead on working to defeat Barry Goldwater in the presidential election. Roy Wilkins of the NAACP; Martin Luther King Jr. of the SCLC; John Lewis of the SNCC; A. Philip Randolph of the Negro-American Labor Council; Whitney Young of the National Urban League; and James Farmer of the Congress of Racial Equality signed for their respective organizations.
- North American Aviation conducted its first glide test of the Paraglider Landing System Program, a precursor to the reusable space shuttle that would characterize the U.S. space program in the 1980s and 1990s. A helicopter towed the vehicle to an altitude of 2,600 feet (790 m). After about 20 minutes of total flight time, the test pilot brought the tow-test vehicle (TTV) to a smooth three-point landing simultaneous with a release of the tow cable and the wing.
- Died: Gunnar Reiss-Andersen, 67, Norwegian poet and dramatist

== July 30, 1964 (Thursday) ==
- The Central Committee of the Soviet Union's Communist Party addressed a letter to the Chinese Communist Party and expressed concern over the differences that had arisen between the two parties in the previous four years. A proposal was advanced for Chinese representatives to come to Moscow on December 15. The Chinese would issue a hostile reply on August 30.
- The United Kingdom agreed to grant independence to The Gambia, its "first and last colonial possession in West Africa", effective February 18, 1965. Sir Dawda Jawara, Prime Minister of the British protectorate, had led a delegation for an eight-day conference in London to ask for independence in February 1965, while former Chief Minister Pierre Sarr N'Jie had asked for a December 1965 date so that new voters could be registered before elections could be held.
- At NASA's request, the Gemini Program Office (GPO) provided a study for Gemini missions beyond the 12 originally planned. "The Advanced Gemini Missions Conceptual Study" described 16 additional possible missions, including a space station experiment, a satellite chaser mission, a lifeboat rescue mission, and both a circumlunar and lunar orbiting mission. On February 28, 1965, GPO would report that the proposal for the additional Gemini missions had been rejected, and production of more Gemini launch vehicles canceled.
- In the British protectorate of Northern Rhodesia, still three months away from becoming independent as the Republic of Zambia, government troops captured the stronghold of the 75,000-member Lumpa Church and brought a temporary halt to their attacks on rural villages in the Northern Province. In the previous week, the sect's members had killed more than 200 people. When the heavily armed government troops surrounded the headquarters at Sione, the sect's leader, Alice Lenshina, had escaped. Rather than surrender, the tribesmen charged at the government soldiers with spears; 65 of the sect members died in the gunfire, and two of the soldiers were slightly injured.
- Patrol boats from the Republic of Vietnam Navy (South Vietnam) moved into the Gulf of Tonkin on an American-funded covert mission, and attacked two islands off North Vietnam, Hon Me and Hon Ngu. A retaliatory attack by the North Vietnamese on an American gunboat, on August 2, would become the basis for American escalation in the Vietnam War.
- Born:
  - Jürgen Klinsmann, manager of the U.S. national soccer team (2011–2016) and the German national team (2004–2006), and striker for the West German national team; in Göppingen, West Germany
  - Vivica A. Fox, American actress and television producer; in South Bend, Indiana
- Died:
  - James M. Landis, 64, former Chairman of the Securities and Exchange Commission, dean of the Harvard University law school, and adviser to three presidents, drowned accidentally in his swimming pool in Harrison, New York.
  - Clair Engle, 52, U.S. Senator for California since 1959 and Congressman representing northeastern California from 1943 to 1959; of a brain tumor.

== July 31, 1964 (Friday) ==
- The U.S. lunar orbiter Ranger 7 sent back the first close-up photographs of the Moon, with images 1,000 times clearer than anything ever seen from Earth-bound telescopes. In all, the orbiter transmitted 4,316 photographs to the Jet Propulsion Laboratory in Pasadena, California before impacting at the Mare Nubium at 1325:49 UTC. At 1308:36 UTC (5:08 a.m. at the JPL in California), the camera began transmitting its first images, the last being 3/10ths of a second before it became the first American spacecraft to "land" on the Moon.
- The first "all-nuclear task force" began Operation Sea Orbit, departing from Gibraltar on a voyage around the world without refueling. The U.S. Navy aircraft carrier USS Enterprise, and the guided missile cruisers USS Long Beach, and USS Bainbridge were powered solely by nuclear reactors, and would travel 30,565 nautical miles in 65 days before completing their mission on October 1.
- In an event at Los Altos, California, swimmer Dick Roth broke the world record in the 400 metres individual medley.
- Died: Jim Reeves, 40, American country singer, was killed when the small plane he was piloting encountered a violent thunderstorm while flying over Brentwood, Tennessee. Reeves and a friend, piano player Dean Manuel, were returning to Nashville from Batesville, Arkansas. After a two day search, the light plane would be found in a thickly wooded area.
