= Murderer's Grave Station =

Butterfield Overland Mail stagecoach stop in Arizona

- Locale
- Kinyon Station, Kenyon Station
- Location within Arizona Location within the United States
- Coordinates: 33°01′45″N 112°55′42″W
- Country: United States
- State: Arizona
- County: Maricopa
- Elevation: 380 ft (120 m)
- Time zone: UTC-7 (MST (no DST))

Murderer's Grave Station is a historic locale, later called Kinyon Station and Kenyon Station was a stagecoach station of the Butterfield Overland Mail located along the Gila River in Arizona. The site was located 20 miles east of Oatmans Flat Station and 15 miles west of Gila Ranch Station. It was located along the Gila River near the present site of the Painted Rock Reservoir

== History ==
The site was originally a Native American village named Rancheria de San Diego by Father Francisco Garces in 1774. Subsequently, it was named Murderers Grave in the 1850s for an accused murderer who was hung there by travelers on the Southern Emigrant Trail during the California Gold Rush. It was renamed "Kinyon Station" in 1858 for Marcus L. Kinyon, station agent for the Butterfield Overland Mail. In 1872 the name became 'Kenyon Station' for Charles H. Kenyon, superintendent of Moore and Carrs Stage line from Tucson to Yuma from 1872 to 1879.

Murderer's Grave or Kenyon Station site is located in Maricopa County, Arizona at an elevation of 380 ft. It can be seen on the USGS 1:24K topographic map Horn, AZ.
