= Butterfield Pass =

Gap in the Maricopa Mountains, Arizona

Coordinates: 33°02′49.16″N 112°28′07.56″W

Butterfield Pass is a gap in the range of the Maricopa Mountains in Maricopa County, Arizona. The pass lies at an elevation of 1,755 feet / 535 meters.

== History ==
This pass was originally known as Pima Pass during the years the Butterfield Overland Mail route ran through it. Later it was renamed to memorialize the stage line.
