= Launch 5 =

Coordinates: 41.186527°N 73.858731°W

- Launch 5 patrols the Hudson River

History

United States
- Name: Patrolman Walburger
- Namesake: Patrolman Henry Walburger
- Owner: Launch 5
- Operator: Launch 5; previously New York City Police Department Harbor Unit
- Route: Jamaica Bay
- Ordered: 1966
- Builder: Turecamo Tug
- Laid down: 1966
- Christened: November 18, 1966
- Refit: 2002
- Notes: www.launch5.com

General characteristics
- Type: Patrol launch; United States Coast Guard Auxiliary
- Displacement: 25 tons
- Length: 52 feet
- Propulsion: Twin Caterpillar diesel engines

Launch 5 is a restored NYPD patrol launch presently in use as a United States Coast Guard Auxiliary Facility as well as for volunteer non-profit environmental, public safety and educational work. Launch 5 enjoys a rich history beginning with her construction and dedication in 1966 and continuing to this day including valuable missions and enjoying substantial media exposure. Her crew is a group of volunteers who donate time and money to keep her afloat and to take her to public service.

In addition to being a working vessel, Launch 5 serves as a floating memorial to the officer she was named after, Patrolman Henry Walburger, who was killed in the line of duty in 1964. The vessel goes by both names - Patrolman Walburger and Launch 5. All NYPD Harbor Unit patrol launches are given a numbered designation welded to the outside of the wheelhouse. Patrolman Walburger was assigned N^{o} 5. She is 52 feet (16 m) in length, powered by twin diesel engines and weighs 25 tons.

== History ==
=== Slaying of Officer Henry Walburger ===
At 6:45 a.m. on July 27, 1964, Patrolman Henry Walburger and his partner were dispatched to an apartment building in the 9th pct. of Manhattan for a possible burglary in progress. When they arrived, Walburger ascended the fire escape to discover a white male holding two black females hostage. The white male shot Patrolman Walburger through the window and he died.

=== Construction and commissioning of Launch N^{o} 5 ===
Launch 5 on Dedication Day

During the summer of 1966 the first four of a fleet of new steel patrol launches were being built to replace the aging wooden fleet. They were being built by Turecamo Tug in the Matton Shipyard on the western bank of the Hudson River on Van Schaick Island, Cohoes NY. One of them was to bear the number "N^{o} 5". Years later, photos of her construction surfaced through a chance meeting with a retired shipbuilder who worked in the yard at the time.

On November 18, 1966, Launch 5 was christened the Patrolman Walburger in a dedication ceremony attended by department brass, Henry's widow and children. After a ceremonial ride with the family, Launch N^{o} 5 began an approximate 30-year career as a very active patrol launch in the Jamaica Bay area of New York City - saving lives, property and enforcing the law.

=== Demise of Launch N^{o} 5 ===
Sometime in the early nineties, as a new fleet of aluminum launches were being put into service in the New York City Police Department Harbor Unit, Launch N^{o} 5 was sold as surplus to a private party who eventually let it sink in the Passaic River. She lay on the bottom of that river, sinking deeper and deeper into the mud, for about a year.

=== Raising of Launch N^{o} 5 ===
In 1998, Greg Porteus, a retired New York State Trooper whose father served aboard Launch 5 as a member of the NYPD Harbor Unit in the sixties and seventies, learned about Launch 5 lying on the bottom of the river and decided to embark on the project of raising and restoring the vessel. The project turned into a journey of its own taking in excess of four years and many thousands of dollars to accomplish. But many friendships and loyalties were built along the way. Launch 5 had her hull below the waterline completely replaced, was repowered with brand new Caterpillar diesels. She continues to be improved with new navigation systems, generator, etc.

=== Resurrection of Patrolman Walburger's spirit ===
In the summer of 2002, the restoration was completed and she was rededicated to Patrolman Henry Walburger. The original dedication and name plaques were donated and affixed to the wheelhouse where they remain today. Patrolman Walburger's son Henry Jr., a retired NYPD detective, became an active crewmember and member of the US Coast Guard Auxiliary along with Greg and the rest of the Launch 5 Crew.

== Launch N^{o} 5 today ==
Since her rededication in 2002, Launch 5 has been very busy again as a volunteer vessel - saving lives, providing security and public safety and helping to keep the Hudson River clean. But counted among her most proud achievements are the dozens of people who have been brought together through her restoration, service and her role as a floating memorial to the slain patrolman. In fact, she has come to symbolize the memories of all officers slain in the line of duty - and she carries those spirits with her on every active mission.

=== Missions ===
As a volunteer facility for the United States Coast Guard Auxiliary, Launch N^{o} 5 has participated in hundreds of "routine" safety and homeland security patrols. But she has also been called upon for more distinguished missions such as:

- Security for the Queen Mary 2 on her maiden voyage out of New York Harbor
- NY Harbor tour for 10 wounded Army soldiers from the Iraq war
- USCG Admiral transport for the Republican National Convention in 2004 and a change of command in 2006
- Tour of the Hudson River to West Point with Congresswoman Sue Kelly
- Homeland Security Science Mission - mapping Loran in NT Harbor
- A multi agency rescue drill
- Helicopter Rescue Demonstration
- As a platform for the filming of a U.S. Navy documentary during Fleet Week
- As safety boat for the Hudson-Fulton-Champlain Quadricentennial

=== Media ===
Launch 5's activities have drawn some media attention as well. Numerous newspaper articles have been written about her and her crew. Two impressive international magazine articles have been written as well. One of them was a seven-page tribute which was published in Passagemaker magazine. The other one was a centerfold photo spread in Professional Mariner magazine. She has appeared in numerous TV News spots and was featured in the opening scene of and episode of the Law & Order TV series. In January 2006, Launch 5 and her crew were filmed for a pivotal scene in Steven Soderbergh's movie Guerilla - a film about Che Guevara - which was released in 2008.
