= West Prong Waterman Wash =

Waterway in Maricopa County, Arizona

West Prong Waterman Wash is a tributary steam or arroyo of Waterman Wash, in Maricopa County, Arizona. Its mouth is at its confluence with Waterman Wash at an elevation of 1,132 feet / 345 meters. Is source is at 33°00′25″N 112°22′14″W at an elevation of 1,750 feet in the Maricopa Mountains.
