= Sevenmile Mountain (Arizona) =

Summit in Maricopa County, Arizona

- Location within Arizona

Highest point
- Elevation: 2,948 ft (899 m)
- Prominence: 1,775 ft (541 m)
- Coordinates: 33°07′34″N 112°13′25″W

Geography
- Country: United States
- State: Arizona
- County: Maricopa County

Sevenmile Mountain is a summit in Maricopa County, Arizona. It rises to a prominence of 1,775 feet / 541 meters and elevation of 2,948 feet / 899 meters.
