= February 1964 =

Month of 1964

<<	February 1964					>>
Su	Mo	Tu	We	Th	Fr	Sa
						1
2	3	4	5	6	7	8
9	10	11	12	13	14	15
16	17	18	19	20	21	22
23	24	25	26	27	28	29

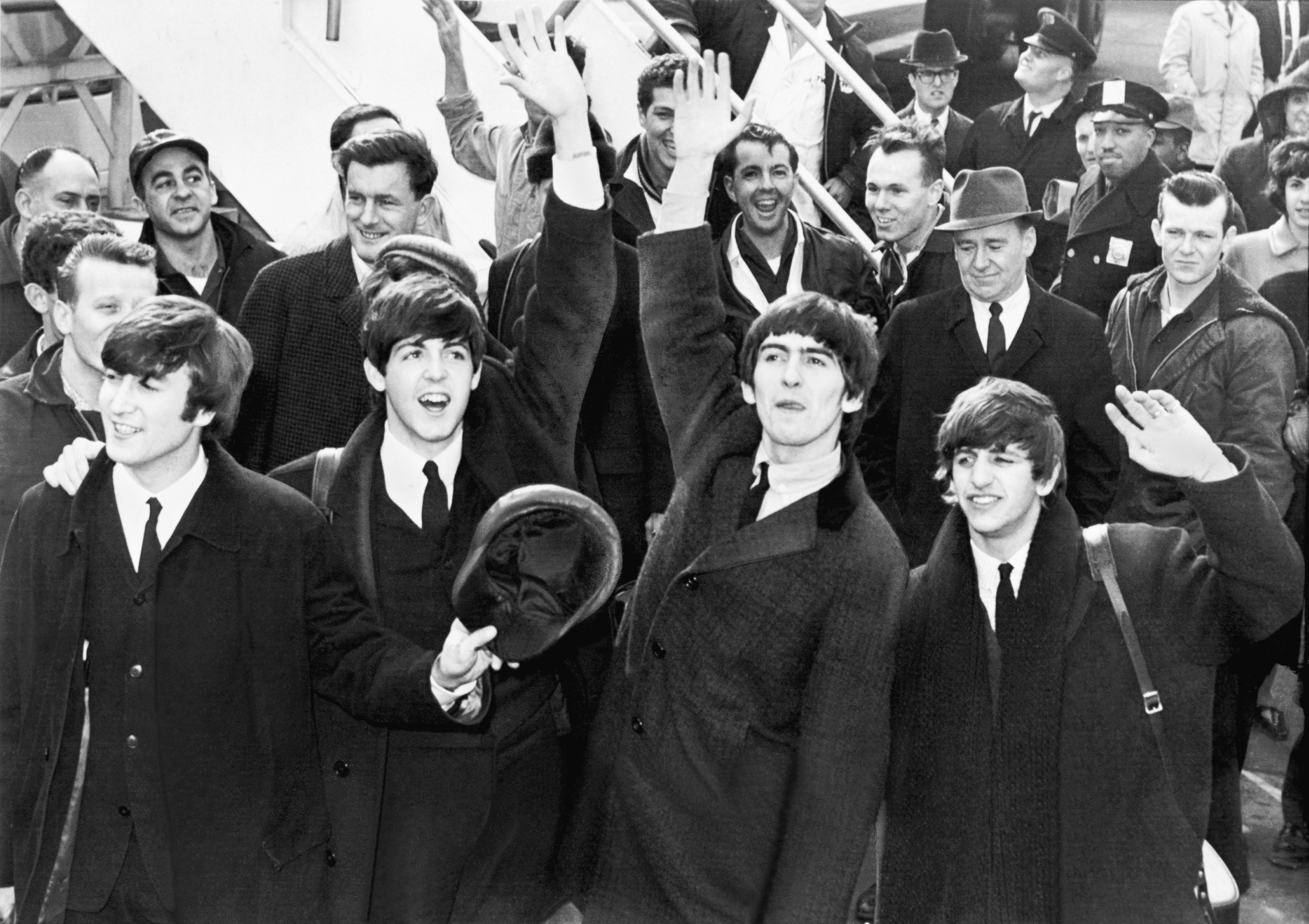
February 7, 1964: The Beatles (John Lennon, Paul McCartney, George Harrison and Ringo Starr) arrive in America

The following events occurred in February 1964:

== February 1, 1964 (Saturday) ==
- At least 70 people, most of them passengers on the Argentine Railways "Firefly Express" train, were killed in a head-on collision with a freight train. The express train was carrying 1,040 passengers who were returning to Buenos Aires from the vacation resort of Mar Del Plata. As it was approaching the station at Altamirano, 65 miles (105 km) from Buenos Aires, the express crashed into a steam-hauled freight train. Both locomotives exploded, spreading burning diesel fuel over a wide area and setting the first three-passenger cars on fire. Rescue workers were unable to search for survivors for several hours because of the intensity of the blaze. A police doctor, giving an estimate of 34 deaths, conceded that "There is no telling how many bodies burned up in the fire".
- The first commercial Boeing 727 flight was made as Eastern Airlines Flight 638 departed Miami at 8:30 a.m., on a flight to Washington D.C.'s Dulles Airport and a final arrival at Philadelphia. United Air Lines would inaugurate its service on February 6, and American Airlines would follow on April 12.
- At the annual International Toy Fair in New York, the Hasbro toy company unveiled the first "action figure" and launched the "G.I. Joe" series of large (12 inches (300 mm) tall), realistic looking toys with movable limbs. The toy received greater publicity at the International Toy Fair in Vancouver on March 3, 1964.
- McDonnell Aircraft Corporation began Gemini spacecraft pyrotechnic hatch firing tests in conjunction with the ejection seat system. On the first test, the hatch opened and locked in 350 milliseconds (1/300th of a second), but the result was still 50 milliseconds over the allowable time.
- The Beatles vaulted to the #1 spot on the U.S. singles charts for the first time, with "I Want to Hold Your Hand", officially starting the British Invasion in the U.S.
- Died: J. Robert Atkinson, 76, blind American publisher and founder of the Braille Institute of America

== February 2, 1964 (Sunday) ==
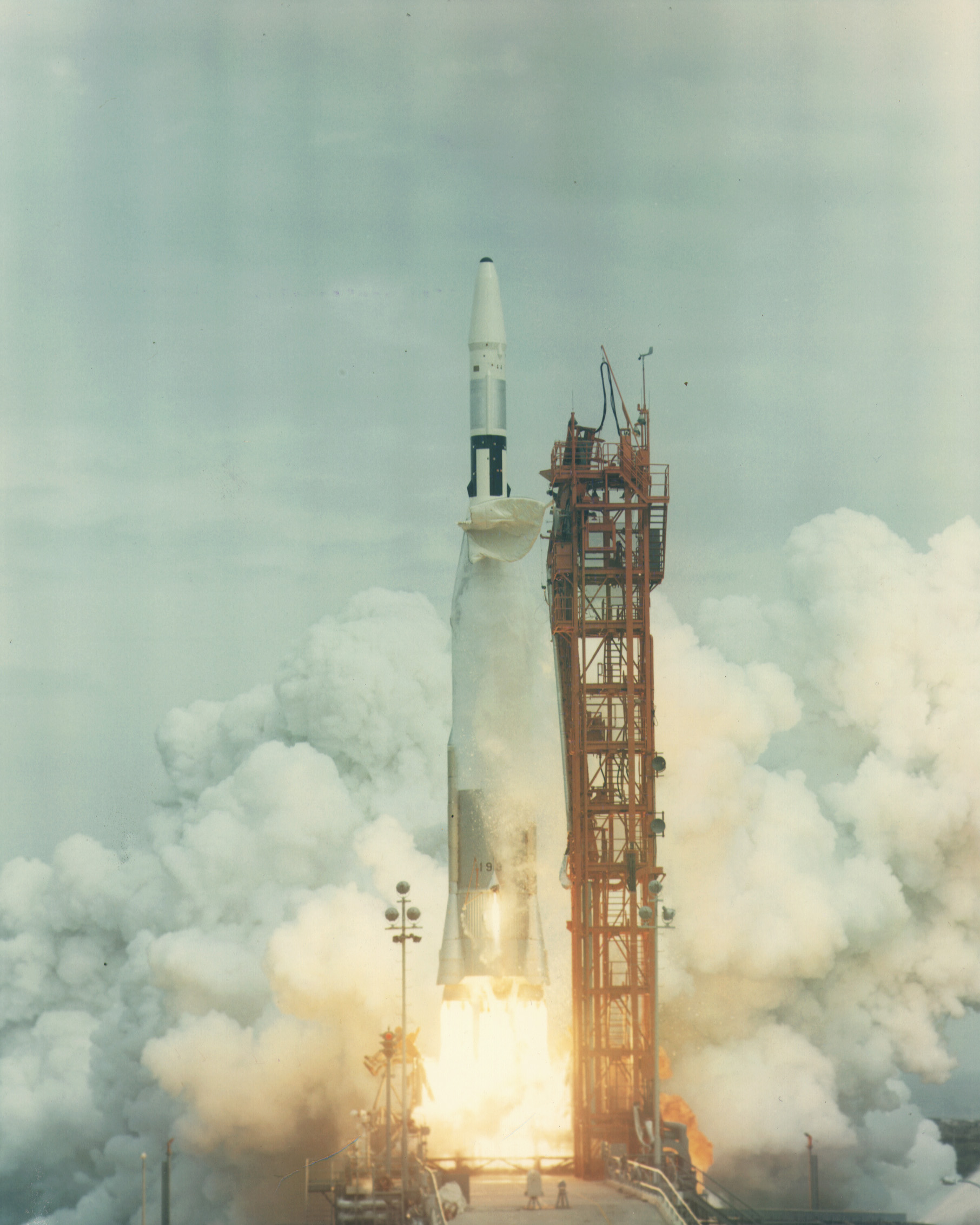
February 2, 1964: Launch of Ranger 6

- The Ranger 6 American lunar probe began its 900-mile (1,400 km) descent to the Moon at 4:09 in the morning, Eastern time, but when the command came from NASA ground control for its six television cameras to turn on, nothing happened. During its 14-minute drop to the lunar surface, the probe was supposed to take 3,000 pictures and relay them back to Earth before impact. It crashed in the Mare Tranquillitatis at 09:24:33 between the Pliny and Dionysius craters.
- Fred Hastings, a 29-year-old skydiver from Louisville, Kentucky, survived a 5,500-foot (1,700 m) plunge to Earth despite the failure of his parachute. The lines of his main parachute became tangled with the canopy, and the emergency chute on his chest got tangled with the main chute. The reserve chute, however, caught enough air to slow his speed to 50 miles per hour (80 km/h), moments before he crashed into rain-soaked ground adjacent to the Freeman Municipal Airport in Seymour, Indiana.
- The nude body of Hannah Tailford, a 30-year-old prostitute, was found in the River Thames near the Hammersmith Bridge in London, ten days after she had last been seen at her home. Tailford was the first of six victims of a serial killer whose modus operandi would lead to the designation "Jack the Stripper".
- Manufacture of the heatshield for Gemini spacecraft No. 3 (for the crewed Gemini 3 mission) was completed. This shield was 1.0 inch (25 mm) thick, twice as thick as those for the uncrewed spacecraft Gemini 1 and Gemini 2.
- The U.S. Coast Guard seized four Cuban fishing boats in U.S. territorial waters near the Dry Tortugas and jailed the fishermen at Key West. In retaliation, Cuba would cut off the water supply to the U.S. Navy base at Guantanamo Bay.
- Born: Ramesh Kumar Nibhoria, Indian Punjabi engineer and inventor; in Firozpur

== February 3, 1964 (Monday) ==
- The New York City school boycott, also known as Freedom Day, described by one American author as "the largest civil rights demonstration in the nation's history", began and involved more than 460,000 African-American and Puerto Rican students and 3,500 teachers, who refused to show up at the city's public schools, as a protest against alleged de facto racial segregation. The number represented at least one-third of the city's schoolchildren, and shut down predominantly black schools in Harlem and in Brooklyn.
- The North Vietnamese Air Force established its first jet fighter unit, Fighter Regiment No. 921, nicknamed the Sao Dao regiment. A few weeks later, the first North Vietnamese jet pilots, prepared to fly MiG-17s, began their training in the Soviet Union, and based their operations at the Noi Bai base near Hanoi. North Vietnamese jet fighter units would be based in the People's Republic of China until August 1964 while their pilots underwent training.
- Ewald Peters, who had been the chief bodyguard for West German Chancellor Ludwig Erhard only four days earlier, hanged himself in his jail cell in Dortmund, where he was being held on suspicion of war crimes. Peters, who had been assigned to Nazi-occupied Ukraine during World War II, was arrested on January 31 after returning with Chancellor Erhard from a state visit to Italy.
- The Warren Commission began its first hearings in the investigation of the assassination of United States President John F. Kennedy. The first of 93 witnesses whose testimony was taken by the Commission was Marina Oswald, the widow of accused assassin Lee Harvey Oswald, who appeared in a closed-door session.
- Garrett Corporation's AiResearch Manufacturing Division was awarded a contract for $133,358 for the Project Gemini extravehicular pressurization and ventilation system.

== February 4, 1964 (Tuesday) ==
- Yuri Nosenko, an officer of the Soviet spy agency, the KGB, defected to a representative of the American spy agency, the CIA, in Geneva. Instead of receiving favorable treatment, Nosenko instead would be imprisoned by the CIA for nearly four years in a CIA holding area near Clinton, Maryland, and interrogated regularly (and brutally) because the agency believed that he was a double agent. On October 27, 1967, Nosenko would be moved and confined in "a comfortable safehouse in the Washington area" and interrogation gave way to his being "interviewed under friendly, sympathetic conditions" by another office within the CIA. A 1970 internal CIA report would later conclude not only that Nosenko was a bona fide defector, but also that he was "the most valuable and economical defector this Agency has ever had".
- In a ceremony at the White House, the Twenty-fourth Amendment to the United States Constitution was officially certified, 12 days after it had been ratified by the 38 states. Bernard L. Boutin, the Administrator of General Services signed the certificate as required by law, and U.S. President Lyndon Johnson signed as a witness to the amendment, which outlawed the poll tax in federal elections.
- Police in the village of San Pablo District of the Canchis Province of Peru fired into a crowd of about 8,000 peasants who had protested at an open market, killing 19 people, mostly women. Afterward, government troops imprisoned about 200 agitators in the region.
- General Motors introduced the Oldsmobile Vista Cruiser and the Buick Sport Wagon.
- Died: Alfred Wiener, 78, German Jewish politician who had been General Secretary of the Central Organization of German Citizens of the Jewish Faith during the 1920s, before fleeing Nazi Germany in 1933.

== February 5, 1964 (Wednesday) ==
- India's chief delegate to the United Nations, Education Minister M. C. Chagla, told the UN Security Council that "I wish to make it clear on behalf of my Government that under no circumstances can we agree to the holding of a plebiscite in Kashmir," responding to charges by the Pakistan Foreign Minister that India had backed out of its 1948 offer to hold elections so that the Kashmiri people could decide which nation they wished their region to be part of. In 1965, India would incorporate its claimed area into what would become the state of Jammu and Kashmir. Since 1990, February 5 has been observed as "Kashmir Day" by the nation of Pakistan, and by Kashmiri nationalists in India.
- The Gemini rocket's stages were erected in the vertical test facility at Martin-Baltimore for subsystems functional verification testing. Bell Aerosystems began testing the primary propulsion system for the Agena target vehicle. Initial testing caused visible cracks in the outer shell that leaked the propellants as a result of intergranular corrosion. The defective tanks were replaced by start tanks with a new heat-treated shell.
- Born: Laura Linney, American actress; in New York City

== February 6, 1964 (Thursday) ==
- At 1:58 p.m. local time, Cuba cut off the normal water supply to the United States Guantanamo Bay Naval Base, in reprisal for the U.S. seizure the previous Sunday of four Cuban fishing boats (and the 36 fishermen on board) off the coast of Florida, by shutting off a freshwater pipeline from the Yateras River. Cuban Premier Fidel Castro told foreign correspondents that he would allow water to flow to the U.S. Navy base, which had been leased from Cuba for decades before Castro came to power, for one hour each day "out of deference to the families of American personnel on base". At the time, there were 10,500 U.S. residents on the 31-square-mile (80 km^{2}) base, 2,400 of whom were women and children. Over the next ten months, U.S. Navy tankers would deliver fresh water to the Guantanamo base from Ocho Rios, Jamaica, and Port Everglades, Florida, until a desalinization plant could be constructed. On December 6, 1964, the base would be able to convert the ocean into potable water.
- The governments of the United Kingdom and France made simultaneous announcements in London and Paris that they had reached an agreement for construction of the first railway tunnel underneath the English Channel. The original plan for the proposed Channel Tunnel (which would open 30 years later, in 1994) was for a 33-mile-long (53 km) railroad tunnel running from Dover to Sangatte.
- Lieutenant Colonel Eugene Ebaya, 44, the Chief of Staff of the Army of the Congo and second in command to General Joseph Mobutu, was assassinated by a poison arrow shot by rebels in the Kwilu Province. Ebaya had been ambushed while in a convoy on the road between the provincial capital of Kikwit and the besieged town of Gungu.
- Died: Emilio Aguinaldo, 94, Filipino freedom fighter who led the insurgency against Spain, and later the United States, during their occupation of the Philippines in the late 19th century.

== February 7, 1964 (Friday) ==
- A jury in Jackson, Mississippi, trying Byron De La Beckwith for the murder of Medgar Evers June 12, 1963, reported that it could not reach a verdict after 11 hours of deliberation, and a mistrial was declared at 11:30 in the morning. An unidentified source told the press that the jury had been deadlocked, with 7 jurors in favor of acquittal and 5 for a conviction, after more than 20 ballots.
- The Beatles arrived from England at New York City's JFK International Airport at 1:20 in the afternoon on Pan Am Flight 101 from London, and received a tumultuous reception from a throng of screaming fans, marking the first occurrence of "Beatlemania" in the United States. The "Fab Four" stayed in suites 1260, 1263, 1264 and 1273 of the Plaza Hotel.
- The Aerospace Corporation and U.S. Air Force expressed their concerns over the increased weight of the Gemini spacecraft, which would potentially squeeze out the limited capacity for the United States Department of Defense experiments. As an example, the weight of Spacecraft No. 8 had been increasing at an average of 35 pounds (16 kg) per month since early 1963.
- The Golden Hawks, aerobatic team of the Royal Canadian Air Force, was disbanded after less than five years of operation. Canada's Department of National Defence dropped the program because of its one million dollar per year cost and because the team's seven Canadair Sabre jet planes were difficult to maintain.
- The ABC television detective series 77 Sunset Strip, which had fired all but one of its regular cast, Efrem Zimbalist, Jr., prior to its final season, ended a six-year run with its last original episode. It was replaced in the 7:30 Eastern time slot with a short-lived Western series, Destry.
- Troops from Somalia crossed into Ethiopia and attacked the border post at Tog Wajaale, triggering a war between the two African nations. A ceasefire between the two sovereign nations would be implemented on April 1.
- Fulbert Youlou, the first President of the Republic of the Congo, was freed from the prison where he had been held since his overthrow on August 15, 1963, after his supporters overpowered guards and liberated him.

== February 8, 1964 (Saturday) ==
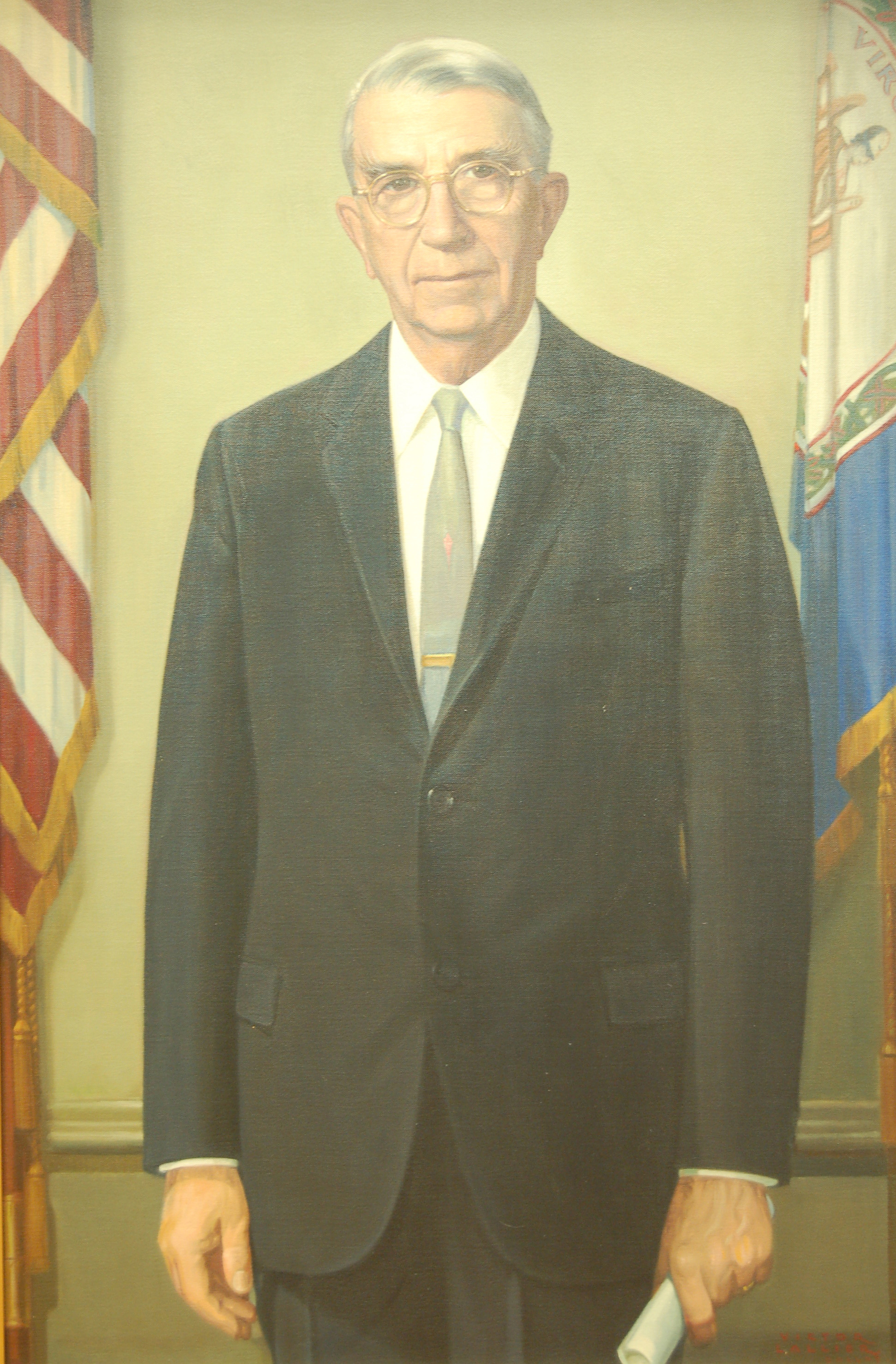
Congressman Smith

- U.S. Congressman Howard W. Smith of Virginia, a supporter of racial segregation, introduced an amendment to the Civil Rights Act of 1964 to add a prohibition against employment discrimination based on gender, one of several attempts by Deep South members of Congress to stall passage of the bill. Smith's motives have been questioned, since he opened with a humorous speech about one of his constituents who had asked him to "remedy the shortage of men for women to marry", though he would say later that he believed that if the law passed, white women should have the same advantages that African American men and women would be given. In any event, female members of Congress were irritated enough by the frivolous "Ladies' Afternoon in the House" debate among their male colleagues, that "the Virginia Congressman's tactical maneuver backfired", the amendment passed 168–133, and Title VII would end up becoming part of the law.
- Nine days after replacing Duong Van Minh as President of South Vietnam, General Nguyen Khanh announced that he would assume the role of Prime Minister, and allow Minh to resume the presidency as a nominal head of state. Minh would be removed from that post six months later, on August 16, and replaced again by Khanh.
- Princess Irene of the Netherlands, second in line to the Dutch throne (after Princess Beatrix), announced that she would renounce her claims to succession in order to marry Carlos de Borbon y Parma, a Roman Catholic and the son of the Carlist pretender to the throne of Spain.
- Manned Spacecraft Center (MSC) decided to use its own facilities to reduce and process data for Gemini postlaunch analysis, saving an estimated $300,000 in costs.
- Born: German Gref, Russian economist and politician; in Panfilovo, Pavlodar Region, Kazakh SSR
- Died:
  - Ernst Kretschmer, 75, German psychiatrist who first identified the persistent vegetative state known as Kretschmer's syndrome
  - Boshirō Hosogaya, 75, former Imperial Japanese Navy admiral

== February 9, 1964 (Sunday) ==
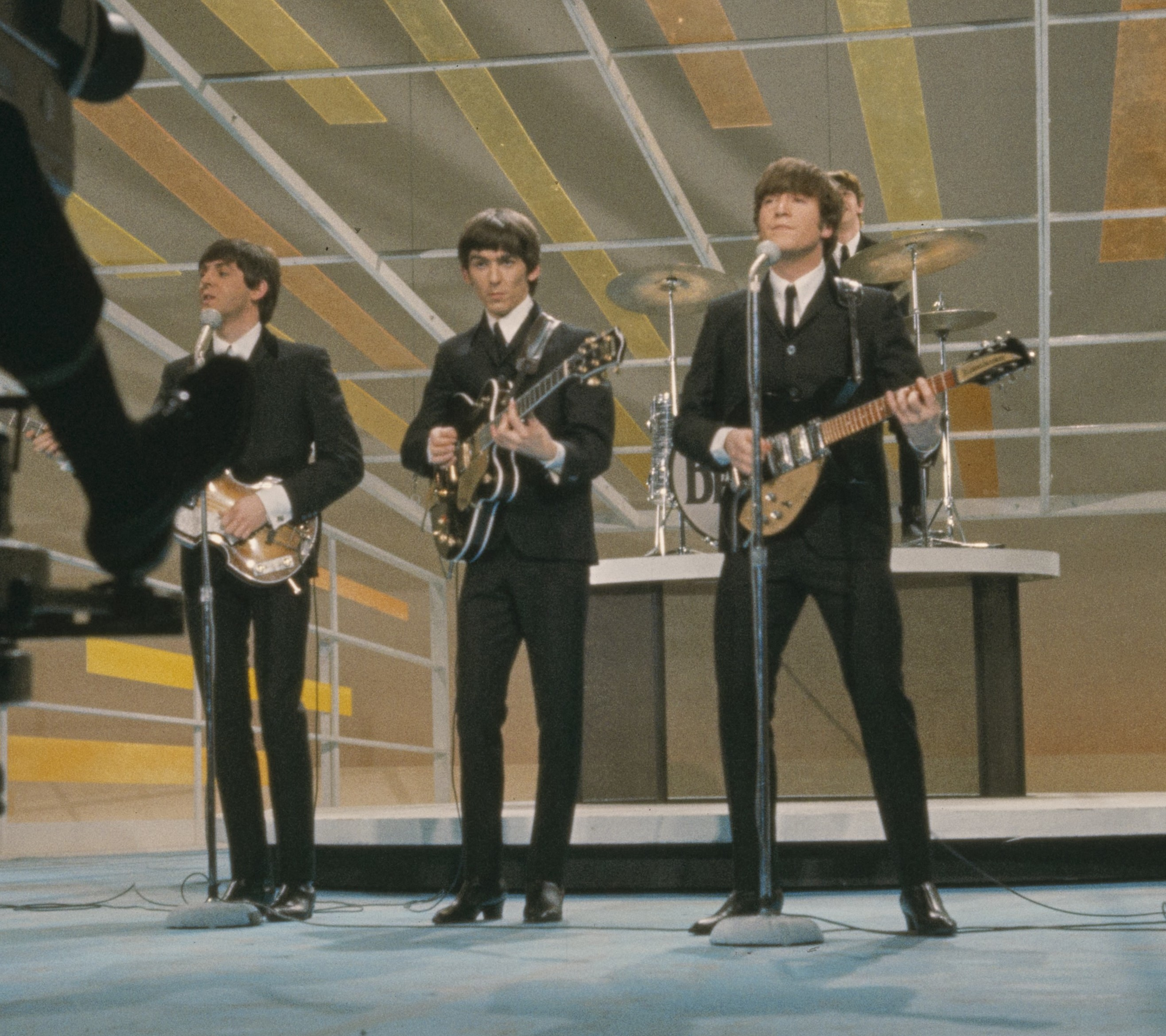
February 9, 1964: The Beatles perform on The Ed Sullivan Show

- The Beatles appeared on The Ed Sullivan Show at 8:00 p.m. in New York City, marking their first live performance on American television. According to an AP report, "[T]he 721 members of the audience — mostly young girls — kept up a steady stream of squeals, sighs and yells." The show also featured Welsh stage actress "Two Ton Tessie" O'Shea in between the Beatles' two performances. The A.C. Nielsen Company would report two weeks later that the CBS show "was seen on television sets in an estimated 23 million homes and by close to 70 million people." (In December, Variety would quote the figure of a "73 million audience".) The appearance became the catalyst for the mid-1960s "British Invasion" of American popular music.
- The 1964 Winter Olympics closed at Innsbruck in Austria. In the final event, held before the closing ceremony, Toralf Engan of Norway won the gold medal in final event, the 90 meter ski jump. The night before the closing ceremony, Ute Gähler, a member of the women's luge team of East Germany, traveled 25 miles (40 km) to Austria's border with West Germany, then crossed over and defected.
- The 1964 Australian Grand Prix was won in Melbourne by Australia's Jack Brabham. Up until the 37th of 64 laps at Sandown Park, the race had been close until New Zealand's Bruce McLaren had to drop out when his car threw a rod.

== February 10, 1964 (Monday) ==
- An accident killed 82 members of the Royal Australian Navy when the destroyer HMAS Voyager was rammed and cut in half by the aircraft carrier HMAS Melbourne. Voyager Captain Duncan H. Stevens went down with the ship; another 242 of the crew were rescued. The two ships had been conducting maneuvers 20 miles (32 km) off the coast of Jervis Bay, when Voyager cut across the path of Melbourne at about 9:00 in the evening. Chief Petty Officer Jonathan Rogers, who helped evacuate more than 50 sailors to safety before going down with the ship, would be awarded the George Cross posthumously for his heroism. A little more than five years later, HMAS Melbourne would be involved in a similar collision, cutting the American ship USS Frank E. Evans in two and killing 73 men.
- The U.S. House of Representatives voted, 290–130, to approve the Civil Rights Act of 1964, the most comprehensive civil rights legislation in the United States since the Reconstruction Era. Voting in favor were 152 Democrats and 138 Republicans, while 96 Democrats and 34 Republicans, most of them from Southern states, were against. The bill was expected to face a more difficult chance of passage in the U.S. Senate, but, after delays for votes on more than 100 amendments and a long filibuster, would pass there on June 10, 1964, by a margin of 71–29.
- The small West African nation of Sierra Leone became the first to issue the self-adhesive stamp for postage. The stamps that did not need to be licked, made in the shape of the country's boundaries and designed to be peeled off of a wax paper sheet, were issued in connection with the upcoming New York World's Fair and were necessitated by that nation's humid climate, but "infuriated philatelists as the self-adhesive stamps were difficult to remove and save in mint condition".
- Born: Francesca Neri, Italian actress; in Trento
- Died:
  - Chief Petty Officer Jonathan Rogers, 43, Royal Australian Navy officer, died in the sinking of HMAS Voyager. For his heroism in helping as many crew as possible through a small escape hatch before going down with the ship, CPO Rogers was posthumously awarded the George Cross.
  - Eugen Sänger, 58, Austrian aerospace engineer

== February 11, 1964 (Tuesday) ==
- At 12:05 in the morning, Herb Jepko began the first call-in radio show. Jepko, daytime host at KSL (AM), a 50,000 watt clear-channel station in Salt Lake City, Utah, had persuaded the station's management to allow him to fill the early morning hours for a six-week trial. For the first time, listeners could call in and their telephone conversations could be heard on the radio. The show, originally called "The Other Side of the Day" and eventually renamed "Nitecaps", would quickly become a success. By January 1968, it would be broadcast by other stations and on November 4, 1975, would become the first radio call-in show to be broadcast nationally (as part of the Mutual Broadcasting System).
- Simultaneous production of the Kennedy half dollar began at 11:00 a.m. Eastern Time at the Philadelphia and Denver branches of the United States Mint. The coins, made in honor of the late President John F. Kennedy, would go into circulation on March 24 and would replace the previous 50 cent coins that bore the likeness of Benjamin Franklin.
- The Beatles held their first American concert, appearing at Washington, D.C. before 8,000 fans at the Washington Coliseum. The crowd of "youngsters, mostly girls", showed their appreciation by throwing jelly beans on the stage.
- The Nagaland Legislative Assembly, the unicameral state legislature for India's 15th and newest state, met for the first time with 46 representatives.
- The Republic of China (Taiwan) broke off diplomatic relations with France because of French recognition of the People's Republic of China.
- Greek Cypriot and Turkish Cypriot residents begin fighting in Limassol, Cyprus. Within two days, fifty people were killed.
- Born: Sarah Palin, American politician who served as Governor of Alaska and who ran for Vice President of the United States in 2008; as Sarah Louise Heath in Sandpoint, Idaho

== February 12, 1964 (Wednesday) ==
- Police in Buffalo, New York, rescued a radio station worker who had inadvertently found himself the butt of jokes as "a prisoner... in a Chinese fortune cookie factory". Robert Grove had contracted with a bakery owned by Philip Leong to buy 150,000 cookies for a promotion and was touring the factory when it closed early for the Chinese New Year celebration.
- Three nights after performing on The Ed Sullivan Show, The Beatles performed at Carnegie Hall in front of a screaming crowd. An Associated Press reporter commented that "The Beatles... may actually have been playing and singing. The audience couldn't tell. All it heard most of the time was its own screaming."
- U.S. President Johnson issued Executive Order 11141 establishing a U.S. government policy against age discrimination in federal employment and against hiring contractors and subcontractors that practiced such discrimination.
- Born: Goodluck Nanah Opiah, Nigerian politician and Minister of Education since 2022
- Died:
  - Gerald Gardner, 79, English Wiccan and author of the books Witchcraft Today (1954) and The Meaning of Witchcraft (1959)
  - Arthur Upfield, 73, Australian crime novelist and author of the "Bony" mystery series
  - Willy Schmidt-Gentner, 69, German film score composer

== February 13, 1964 (Thursday) ==
- Five days before his trial as a war criminal was due to begin, German psychiatrist Werner Heyde hanged himself in prison at Butzbach.
- Born: Stephen Bowen, United States Navy submariner and NASA astronaut; in Cohasset, Massachusetts
- Died: Ken Hubbs, 22, American major league baseball second baseman for the Chicago Cubs and winner of the National League Rookie of the Year award for 1962, was killed along with a passenger when the plane he was piloting crashed during bad weather. Hubbs had departed from Provo, Utah, to return to his home in Colton, California, when his Cessna 172 went down. The wreckage was found in a lake near Provo, where it went down three minutes after takeoff.

== February 14, 1964 (Friday) ==
- In the United Kingdom, the Cambridgeshire and Isle of Ely Order was issued, proposing to create a new county by merging the areas of the administrative counties of Cambridgeshire and Isle of Ely (with minor boundary changes). The Order was subsequently approved by Parliament. The Huntingdon and Peterborough Order was created to fulfill a comparable function for the neighbouring county of Huntingdonshire and for the Soke of Peterborough. Both orders would be passed despite considerable local opposition. In 1974, the two amalgamations of counties would be combined into a single non-metropolitan county, preserving only the name of Cambridgeshire.
- Born: John A. Gotti, American organized crime boss who succeeded to control of the Gambino crime family in 1992 after the imprisonment of his father, John J. Gotti; in Queens, New York

== February 15, 1964 (Saturday) ==
- The first elections for the new House of Assembly of Papua and New Guinea began under United Nations supervision, with more than 300 candidates "ranging from white planters and patrol officers to primitive natives" standing for the 54 legislative seats. The UN hired 10,000 guards in the Australian-administered territory to protect election officials from hostile tribes. Voting would continue until March 18 and the Assembly would open at Port Moresby on June 8. On New Hanover Island, however, at a polling station in the villages of Ranmelek, the voters expressed their preference for President Lyndon Johnson of the United States; the "Johnson cult" would be seen days later at the villages of Meteran and Taskul, and at Nonovul in the Tigak Islands.
- The United Kingdom and Cyprus requested urgent action by the United Nations Security Council to send UN peacekeeping troops to bring a halt to fighting between the Greek Cypriot and Turkish Cypriot minorities. The move came as warships from Turkey were preparing to invade the Mediterranean island republic.
- Born: Chris Farley, American comedian and actor; in Madison, Wisconsin (died of drug overdose, 1997)
- Died: William Snyder Webb, 82, American anthropologist, archaeologist and physicist

== February 16, 1964 (Sunday) ==
- In parliamentary elections in Greece, the Centre Union (EK) Party, led by Prime Minister Georgios Papandreou won 171 of the 300 available seats, a gain of 45, for a clear majority. The National Radical Union (ERE) Party, led by Panagiotis Kanellopoulos, lost 11 seats to fall to 107 in the unicameral legislature.
- The North Vietnamese Air Force scored its first aerial victory against an American aircraft when the North Vietnamese pilot of a T-28 Trojan trainer aircraft shot down a C-123 Provider transport plane.
- At 2:45 a.m., four members of the Dallas Fire Department – James K. Bigham, James R. Gresham, Jerry T. Henderson, and Ronald E. Manley - were killed while fighting a fire at the Golden Pheasant Restaurant when the first floor collapsed into the basement. The fire went to five alarms, and at one point 750 firefighters were at work on the scene.
- Bell Aerosystems delivered the first Gemini Agena engine to Lockheed. This engine was installed in the propulsion test vehicle assembly (PTVA) at Lockheed's Santa Cruz Test Base.
- Born:
  - Christopher Eccleston, English actor known for being the ninth to portray the title character (during 2005) in Doctor Who; in Salford, Lancashire
  - Bebeto (sports name for José Roberto Gama de Oliveira), Brazilian footballer; in Salvador, Bahia
- Died: Jette Bang, 50, Danish photographer known for her documentation of the people of Greenland

== February 17, 1964 (Monday) ==
- Gabon's president Leon M'ba was toppled by a military coup and his archrival, Jean-Hilaire Aubame, was installed in his place. M'ba, who had dissolved Parliament on January 21 and ordered new elections for February 23 with only his own party's candidates, announced his resignation after the 600-man Gabonese Army seized power, and was then placed under house arrest.
- In the case of Wesberry v. Sanders (376 U.S. 1 1964), the Supreme Court of the United States ruled, 6–2, that congressional districts had to be approximately equal in population. The case arose from a challenge to the state of Georgia's failure to change its congressional districts since the 1930 U.S. census.
- U.S. Postmaster General John A. Gronouski ordered that all letter carriers be provided with pepper spray in order to cut down the incidence of dog bites. "While the dog-bite problem has often been treated more or less as a joke," he said, "it is no laughing matter for our carriers and their families." There had been 7,000 dog bites in 1963. The Post Office Department purchased 115,000 "spray bombs" containing 15% pepper extract, with orders that the spray was not to be shot into a dog's face.
- Bell Aerosystems began tests of the Agena secondary propulsion system. Testing showed a failure of a propellant valve in the Unit I thrust chamber that was fired prior to starting the main engine. A more serious problem during high-temperature firings was that the wall of the Unit II thrust chamber burned through near the injector face after an accumulated firing time of 354 seconds, six seconds below the specification limit of 400 seconds but well in excess of the maximum orbital useful time of 200 seconds. To resolve the burn-through problem, Bell began a test program in September 1964 to determine the cause of failure.
- In the Soviet Union, Gaibnasar Pallayev became Chairman of the Presidium of the Supreme Soviet of the Tadzhik Soviet Socialist Republic, now the Republic of Tajikistan.

== February 18, 1964 (Tuesday) ==
- France intervened in the coup in Gabon, landing 50 soldiers at the Libreville International Airport and then moving out to occupy strategic points. The rebels responded by closing the airport but failed to establish obstacles. By 5:00 in the afternoon, less than 48 hours after the coup began, rebels in the Gabonese presidential palace surrendered to the French troops without incident.
- In a symbolic, but inconsequential, punishment to stop nations from trading with the Communist government of Cuba, the United States halted foreign aid to the United Kingdom, France and Yugoslavia. American foreign aid to the UK was only slightly more than $5,000 at the time, while aid to France was $25,000 and Yugoslavia at $20,000.
- A powerful earthquake struck the central Azores in the North Atlantic Ocean, leading to orders for the evacuation of the 20,000 residents of São Jorge Island amid fears that the island could break apart and sink. All but three of the almost 2,000 houses in the village of Vila das Vejas were destroyed by a series of tremors.
- Gemini Program Office conducted the preflight readiness review of the Gemini 1 spacecraft at Cape Kennedy. Each spacecraft system was reviewed for open items, deviations, and qualification status, but none delayed the placing of the spacecraft on the rocket.
- Born: Matt Dillon, American film actor; in New Rochelle, New York
- Died: Armand Bombardier, 56, Canadian inventor best known for the snowmobile; of cancer

== February 19, 1964 (Wednesday) ==
- Further French troops were airlifted to Gabon to put down the recent army coup. French Air Force planes strafed the rebels at Baraka, while the French Army attacked the insurgents with machine gun fire and mortars. The rebels at the military base surrendered once their ammunition supply ran out, and their commander, Lieutenant Ndo Edou, was executed. Recently deposed President Leon M'ba was rescued unharmed.
- Singer-songwriter Paul Simon wrote "The Sound of Silence", which would become the first of three #1 bestselling singles for the duo Simon & Garfunkel.
- Rashid Karami resigned as Prime Minister of Lebanon and was succeeded by Hussein Al Oweini.
- Born: Brett Kebble, South African gold mining magnate; in Springs, Gauteng (murdered, 2005)

== February 20, 1964 (Thursday) ==
- NASA's George E. Mueller announced that all 12 Gemini flights would end in water landings, signaling the phasing out of development of the paraglider intended for ground landings of the last three Gemini missions. The public announcement that the paraglider had definitely been canceled would come on August 10, 1964.
- Crown Prince Constantine was named as the regent to the Greek throne after his father, King Paul, signed a decree. King Paul was seriously ill with what were reported to be "stomach ulcers" that would require surgery. In actuality, the King was terminally ill with stomach cancer, and would die two weeks later, on March 6.
- Born: French Stewart (stage name for Milton French-Stewart), American actor known for 3rd Rock from the Sun; in Albuquerque, New Mexico
- Died: Verena Holmes, 74, English mechanical engineer and inventor, the first woman member elected to the Institution of Mechanical Engineers (1924)

== February 21, 1964 (Friday) ==
- An attempt to assassinate Turkey's Prime Minister İsmet İnönü failed after the gunman missed three times despite being only 12 feet (3.7 m) away from the premier. İnönü was sitting in his limousine in front of his office in Ankara when Mesut Suna fired at him with a revolver. Earlier in the day, Suna had visited the premier's office, asked for an appointment to discuss a private matter and was told that İnönü was booked all day long. An hour later, when İnönü climbed into his car in order to go to the Meclis, Turkey's Parliament, Suma rushed out of the building entrance and began shooting before being overpowered by security guards.

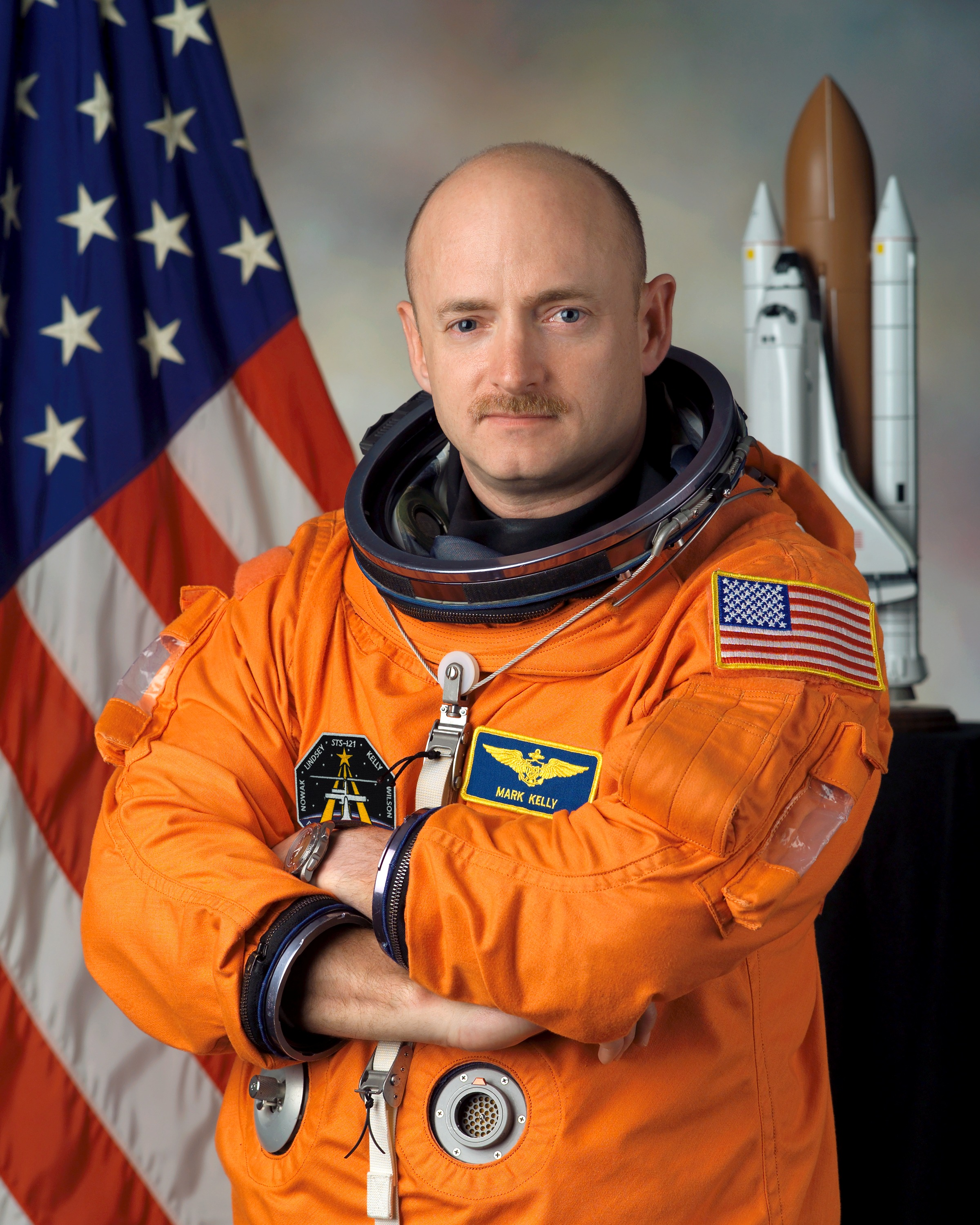
Mark

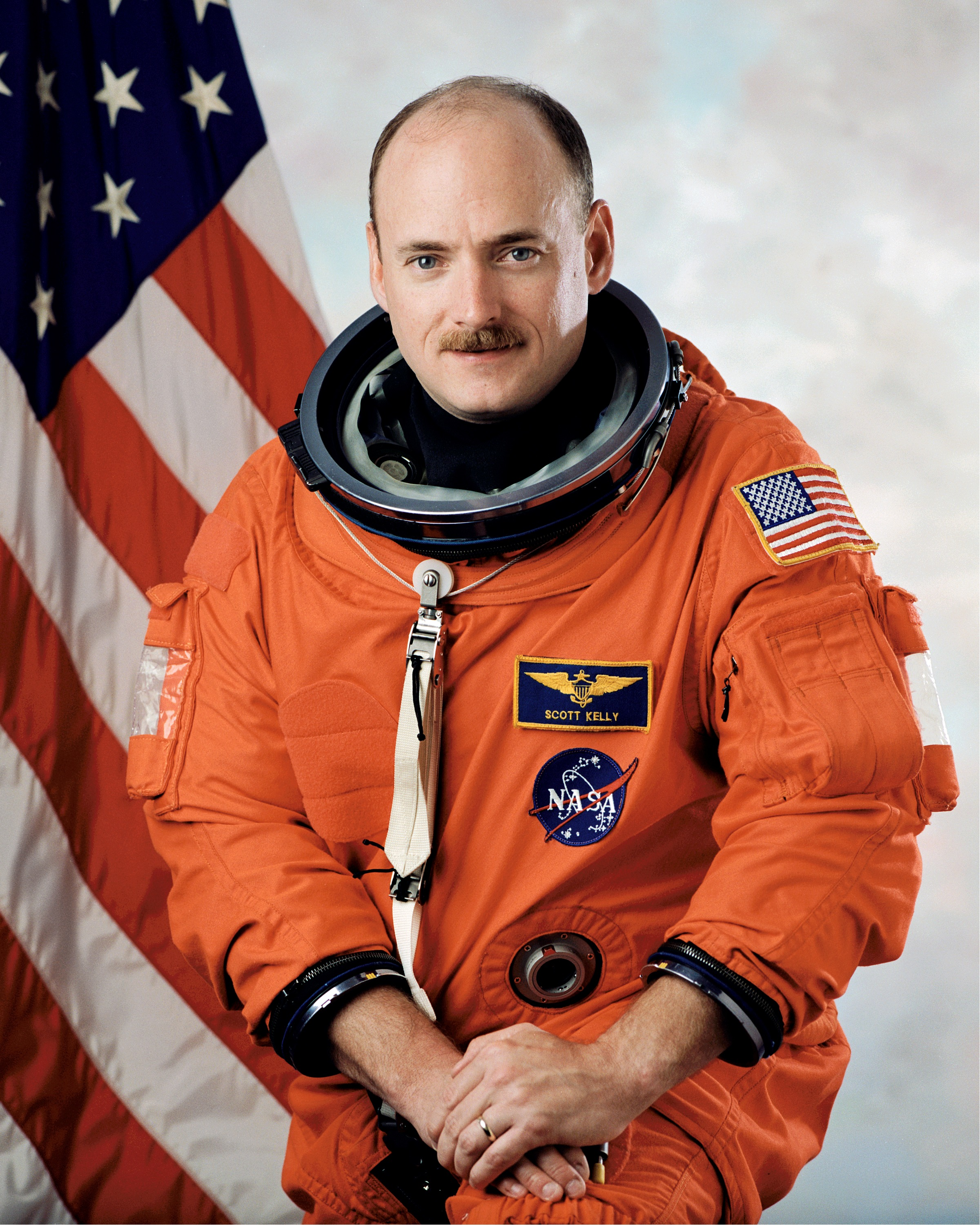
Scott

- Born:
  - Mark Kelly, American politician, former astronaut, and U.S. Navy captain who has served as the junior U.S. senator from Arizona since 2020; in Orange, New Jersey
  - Scott Kelly, American engineer, retired astronaut, and naval aviator; in Orange, New Jersey

== February 22, 1964 (Saturday) ==
- Competitors in the 1964 World Speed Skating Championships in Helsinki got a surprise in the men's 500 meter event when ashes and soot caused at least five of the favorites "to tumble like tenpins". Olympic gold medalist Ants Antson was the first to fall down on the first turn of the track, and Nils Aaness, Fred Maier, Hermann Strutz, and Elio Locatelli fell at the same location, before race officials realized that sparks and debris from a nearby factory had blown on to the ice. Keiichi Suzuki of Japan was the event winner.
- The General Assembly of the U.S. state of Georgia extended its term by 25 minutes after the scheduled February 21 midnight adjournment, in order to revise its ten U.S. congressional districts to comply with the Wesberry ruling earlier in the week. For the first time in its history, metropolitan Atlanta had two U.S. representatives. Approval came after rural legislators attempted filibusters and other stalling tactics, and passed the state House 113–69 and the state Senate, 35–7.
- Claude Chayet began his duties as France's first diplomatic representative to the People's Republic of China. The chargé d'affaires, not officially an ambassador, crossed from Hong Kong at the Lo Wu Control Point and was greeted at the Huanggang Port.
- The Beatles land at London's Heathrow Airport, returning from their brief tour in North America. The band would return again in their much bigger North American tour nearly eight months later.
- Actress Hayley Mills places her hand and foot prints in cement in front of Grauman's Chinese Theatre in Los Angeles.
- Born:
  - Gigi Fernández, Puerto Rican/American professional tennis champion who won 14 Doubles titles in 14 Grand Slam tournaments between 1988 and 1997; in San Juan
  - William Tanui, Kenyan athlete and 1992 Olympic 800 meter gold medalist; in Terik
- Died: Verrier Elwin, 61, English-born Indian anthropologist

== February 23, 1964 (Sunday) ==
- Chrysler's Second Generation HEMI racing engine (426 cubic inches (6,980 cm^{3}) with hemispherical head design) demonstrated its dramatic superiority when it was featured in eight Plymouth Belvedere racecars in the NASCAR opening race, the 1964 Daytona 500. The Belvederes finished in first, second and third place, with Richard Petty capturing the checkered flag in his #43 car, followed by Jimmy Pardue and Paul Goldsmith. Following behind in fourth place was Marvin Panch for the Ford team.
- The Soviet Union and the People's Republic of China began negotiations regarding the borders in the area between Mongolia and Vladivostok. According to Soviet sources, China demanded the return of lands ceded by the Chinese Empire to the Russian Empire in the August 27, 1689, Treaty of Nerchinsk and the 1858 Treaty of Aigun, including Hǎishēnwǎi, where Vladivostok had been built.
- Born: Joseph O'Neill, Irish author; in Cork

== February 24, 1964 (Monday) ==
- Pathologist M. Anthony Epstein examined "EB1", the cultured cell of a sufferer from Burkitt's lymphoma, underneath an electron microscope and, in conjunction with Yvonne Barr and Bert Achong, first identified the Epstein–Barr virus.
- Construction on the 170-mile-long (270 km) Cross Florida Barge Canal, halted since 1936, resumed. A U.S. District Court would halt construction on January 15, 1971, because of the destructive impact of the canal on the Florida wetlands, and the project would be retired still two-thirds incomplete.
- Born: Todd Field, American actor and film director; in Pomona, California

== February 25, 1964 (Tuesday) ==
- All 58 people on Eastern Air Lines Flight 304 were killed when the Douglas DC-8 jet crashed into Lake Pontchartrain 20 miles (32 km) northeast of New Orleans, nine minutes after taking off from New Orleans International Airport. Among the dead was the American singer Kenneth Spencer. Twenty people had gotten off when the airliner landed in New Orleans for one of its stops en route from New York to Mexico City, and 14 passengers boarded. After running into heavy turbulence, the jet went into the lake and broke apart . The wreckage would not be located until March 17, in a 12-foot-deep (3.7 m) crater that the impact had gouged into the bottom of the lake.
- Muhammad Ali, still known at the time as Cassius Clay, defeated Sonny Liston in Miami Beach, Florida, to become the heavyweight boxing champion of the world. Reigning champion Liston fought Clay for six rounds, but was unable to raise his left arm after injuring his shoulder a few days earlier in practice. The fight ended when Liston declined to enter the ring when the 7th round started. Up until then, the match "had been so close at the end of six rounds it could be considered a draw".
- At the Leningrad State University (now the Saint Petersburg State University), cardiac surgeon Vasily Kolesov performed the first sutured internal thoracic artery coronary bypass on a human patient, grafting the left ITA to the left anterior descending artery. Dr. Kolesov followed up on the May 2, 1960 pioneering surgery of Dr. Robert Goetz.
- The Liberal party government of Canada's Prime Minister Lester B. Pearson survived a no-confidence motion by only eight votes. After Canadian House of Commons opposition leader and former premier John Diefenbaker sent the measure to a vote, five other members of the opposition (three Social Credit Party and two New Democrat Party) voted against the resolution to force the resignation of Pearson and his cabinet. The final vote was 120 for and 128 against.
- King Idris I of Libya announced that the north African nation would not renew the American lease of Libyan territory for Wheelus Air Base after the 1970 expiration of the agreement. The decision came four days after President Gamal Abdel Nasser of neighboring Egypt criticized the King for permitting a foreign base to operate in an Arab nation.
- Born: Lee Evans, British comedian and actor; in Avonmouth, Bristol
- Died:
  - Hinrich Lohse, 67, Nazi German war criminal who was the Nazi Reichskommissar for Ostland, (Nazi-occupied Latvia, Lithuania and Estonia) during World War II.
  - Grace Metalious, 39, American novelist, died from liver disease.

== February 26, 1964 (Wednesday) ==
- The Revenue Act of 1964 was signed into law as the largest tax cut in American history, reducing individual income taxes by an average of 20 percent over a two-year period with the goal of stimulating economic growth and investments, and reducing unemployment. The top tax rate (of 91% for any amount over $200,000) was reduced to 65%, and the lowest bracket (20% for all amounts up to $2,000) dropped to 14%, while the corporate tax rate dropped from 52% to 47%. Initially, the growth of gross domestic product would increase, investments would double to 13%, and unemployment would drop from 5.2% to 3.8% over two years; however, the federal budget deficit would increase dramatically as the amount of spending during the Vietnam War went up higher than the amount of federal revenue. The signing came six hours after the U.S. Senate had approved the bill, 74–19, and a day after the House had approved it, 326–83 on Monday.
- Former American astronaut John Glenn slipped on a bathroom rug in his Columbus, Ohio, apartment and hit his head on the bathtub, injuring his left inner ear. The next day, he announced that he would postpone the start of his campaign for the Democratic Party nomination for U.S. Senator for Ohio. A few days later, he would withdraw from the race completely.
- Lockheed Corporation released details of its recommendations to MSC on a scientific space station program, and concluded that a station with a crew of 24 could be orbiting the Earth as early as 1968, at a cost of $2.6 billion for five years' operation. Lockheed recommended using a Saturn V to launch the uncrewed laboratory into orbit and then launching a crewed logistics vehicle to rendezvous and dock at the station.
- NASA Administrator George M. Low approved experiments for the first five Gemini missions. All experiments were classified as Category B, which meant that experiments would not be included if inclusion would delay a scheduled launch.
- Born: Naoto Ohshima, Japanese artist and video game designer, best known for designing characters for the Sonic the Hedgehog series; in Osaka

== February 27, 1964 (Thursday) ==
- After the United States Secret Service received a tip of a plot to assassinate President Johnson during his two-day visit to Florida, "security measures rarely if ever seen in peacetime" were implemented to prevent the threat that a Cuban pilot on a suicide mission would attempt to crash an airplane into the President's Boeing 707 jet, Air Force One. Rather than flying into Miami on his official aircraft, the President landed at West Palm Beach, Florida on one of three "executive transport jets" operated by the U.S. Air Force, with two identical planes making the journey so it would not be clear which one he was on. Upon landing, he boarded a helicopter that had been stripped of "all markings that might have identified the craft" as a presidential vehicle, and flew the 67 miles (108 km) to Miami, landing without prior notice to the press.
- The government of the city of Pisa asked the Ministry of Public Works of Italy to intervene to keep the Leaning Tower of Pisa from toppling over. The proposal, recommended after a study by architect Enzo Vannucci, was to tilt the 184-foot-tall (56 m) tower back slightly from its lean of "almost 11 feet from true perpendicular" by raising it 6 feet (1.8 m), constructing a new concrete base for it to stand upon, and then lowering it, at a cost of more than one million dollars. "No one wants to straighten the tower," an AP report noted, since "Tourists wouldn't flock here to see a straight leaning tower."
- The fifth edition (and first since 1951) of The Concise Oxford Dictionary of Current English was released with an initial printing of 400,000 copies. Among the new words it had added were "beatnik", "rat race" (spelled "rat-race"), the now forgotten "admass" (referring to a demographic of people "influenced by mass methods of publicity"), and "ton-up boy" (a youth who has driven a motorcycle at more than 100 miles per hour (160 km/h)).
- Joseph Francis Bryan, Jr. committed the first of five kidnappings (four of them murders) of young boys over a two-month period. The first victim was 7-year-old John Robinson, who disappeared while riding his bicycle in Mount Pleasant, South Carolina. Bryan would be arrested on April 28, in the parking lot of a mall in New Orleans, with an 8-year-old boy who had vanished from his home in Humboldt, Tennessee a few days earlier.
- The government of Sudan ordered all Christian foreign missionaries to leave the country. Nearly all of the Protestant and Catholic evangelists, who were concentrated in the more religiously diverse south, would leave within three weeks.
- Violinist Efrem Zimbalist performed his last public concert, after 52 years of renowned appearances worldwide, then retired at the age of 73.
- Died:
  - Anna Julia Cooper, 105, American educator and historian, died of natural causes. Born as a slave in North Carolina, she would obtain a Ph.D. in history from the Sorbonne in Paris in 1924.
  - Orry-Kelly, 66, Australian-born costume designer and three-time Academy Award winner

== February 28, 1964 (Friday) ==
- U.S. President Johnson, who had succeeded to the American presidency three months earlier upon the death of John F. Kennedy, began his campaign to win the office in the 1964 U.S. presidential election. Speaking to 3,000 Florida Democrats at a fundraising dinner in Miami Beach, Florida, Johnson emphasized his commitment to civil rights and remarked that "full participation in our society can no longer be reserved to men of one color", adding that his administration would push for equal rights "until we have eliminated the last barrier of intolerance."
- The Dow Jones Industrial Average passed the 800 mark for the first time, rising to 800.14 in the last hour of trading to close at 800.14 points.
- Born: Djamolidine Abdoujaparov, Uzbekistani cyclist; in Tashkent
- Died:
  - Timmy Mayer, 26, American racing driver, was killed in a practice session at Longford, Tasmania, in Australia, when he lost control of his custom-built Cooper T70 at 120 miles per hour (190 km/h), became airborne, and hit a tree next to the course. Mayer had been preparing for the eighth and final race in the inaugural Tasman Series.
  - Gus Lesnevich, 49, American boxer and former world light heavyweight champion from 1941 to 1948, died of a heart attack in his doctor's office.

== February 29, 1964 (Saturday) ==
- All 83 people aboard British Eagle International Airlines Flight 802/6 were killed when the Bristol Britannia crashed into the 8,783-foot-high (2,677 m) Glungezer mountain in Austria's Central Eastern Alps, striking at an altitude of 8,530 feet (2,600 m); an avalanche then carried the debris downhill for 1,200 feet (370 m). Most of the passengers on the propeller-driven plane were on their way to Innsbruck for a weekend skiing trip, after departing London. An investigation would determine that the pilot had descended to 8,500 feet (2,600 m) in an attempt to penetrate through heavy cloud cover while making the approach to Innsbruck.
- U.S. President Lyndon B. Johnson announced that the United States had developed a jet airplane (the A-11), capable of sustained flight at more than 2,000 miles per hour (3,200 km/h) and of altitudes of more than 70,000 feet (21,000 m). The revelation of the existence of the Lockheed A-12 (which had first flown in 1962) was made after Republican challenger Barry Goldwater had said in speeches that Democrats had neglected the defense of the United States.
- A 1962 agreement to create the European Launcher Development Organisation (ELDO), with Australia, Belgium, France, Italy, the Netherlands, the United Kingdom and West Germany working together on a space program, came into effect.
- Ghulam Mohammed Sadiq became Prime Minister (later the Chief Minister) of the Indian state of Jammu and Kashmir and would remain in office until his death on December 12, 1971.
- Gemini Project Office (GPO) began initiation of backup engine programs if the orbit attitude and maneuver system thrusters proved inadequate. Marshall Space Flight Center was to develop a 100-pound-force (440 N) engine for the Saturn S-IVB rocket and the Gemini spacecraft, and Manned Spacecraft Center was developing a radiation-cooled engine. Because of the manufacturing process, almost all thrust chamber assemblies (TCA) had cracks and consequently could not be delivered. Tests showed no apparent degradation of engine life caused by cracks, and Rocketdyne claimed that no TCA in any of their five space engine programs had failed because of a cracked "throat". With certain restrictions, cracked throats were to be accepted.
- Born: James Ogilvy, British magazine publisher and member of British royalty as the first son of Queen Elizabeth II's cousin, Princess Alexandra; at Thatched House Lodge in Richmond Park
