= March 1964 =

Month of 1964

<<	March 1964					>>
Su	Mo	Tu	We	Th	Fr	Sa
1	2	3	4	5	6	7
8	9	10	11	12	13	14
15	16	17	18	19	20	21
22	23	24	25	26	27	28
29	30	31

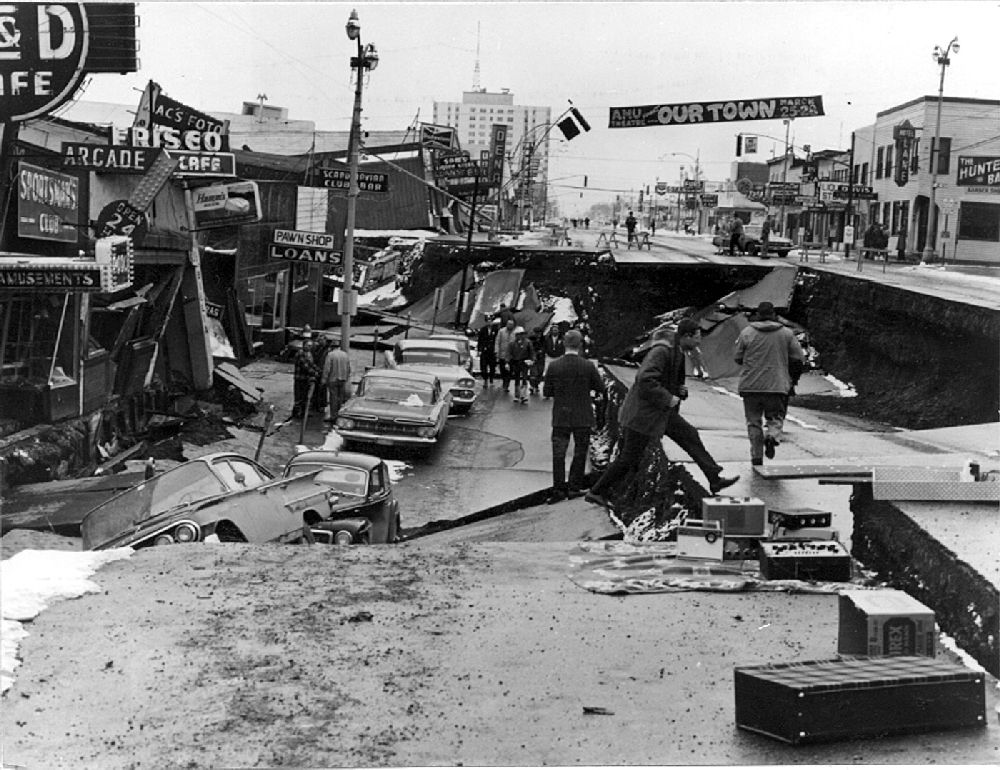
March 27, 1964: Most powerful earthquake in U.S. history strikes Alaska on Good Friday

The following events occurred in March 1964:

== March 1, 1964 (Sunday) ==
- All 85 people on Paradise Airlines Flight 901 were killed when the Lockheed Constellation crashed into a mountain while on its way to Tahoe Valley, California, a ski resort town across the border from casinos in Nevada. Wreckage of the plane was located the next day on an 8,700-foot (2,700 m) ridge in the Sierra Nevada mountains, where it had impacted after running into a sudden snowstorm while on its approach to Tahoe Valley. The plane had taken off from Salinas with 20 people and another 61 passengers boarded at San Jose. Another 15 in San Jose had wanted to board Flight 901 but were told that they would have to catch a later plane.
- The American premiere of Karlheinz Stockhausen's Momente, performed by Martina Arroyo (soprano), the Crane Collegiate Singers of SUNY Potsdam (Brock McElheran, chorus master), and members of the Buffalo Philharmonic Orchestra (Lukas Foss, music director), conducted by the composer, took place in Kleinhans Music Hall in Buffalo, New York.
- The Liberian tanker Amphialos broke in two and sank 230 to 270 nautical miles (430 to 500 km) southeast of Liverpool, Nova Scotia, Canada. HMCS Athabaskan of the Royal Canadian Navy rescued 34 of her 36 crew.
- Anti-government demonstrations began in Gabon, with protesters shouting "Léon M'ba, président des Français!" ("Léon M'ba, President of the French!") and calling for the end of the "dictatorship".
- Born: Florencio Randazzo, Argentine politician; in Chivilcoy
- Died: Richard Welsh, a professional skydiver celebrating his 29th birthday, was killed by an accident blamed on his habit of screaming while pretending to fall off of an airplane and on the fact that he had no pocket on his outfit. Lacking a pocket, Welsh had clinched the handle of his parachute's ripcord between his teeth, but when he opened his mouth as he fell, the cord flew over his shoulder. As he fell 3,000 feet (910 m) to his death, Welsh was seen "groping desperately all the way down" trying to grab the cord to open the chute; his body, along with his unopened parachute, was found in the backyard of a home in Delhi Township, Michigan.

== March 2, 1964 (Monday) ==
- After modifications, a U-2 spyplane was able to successfully land on an aircraft carrier, as pilot Bob Schumacher brought the high-altitude jet down onto the USS Ranger. Previously, the plane's use had been limited to sites within a 1,500-mile (2,400 km) radius of a U.S. base, and some areas of the globe were beyond its reach until it could operate from a mobile airstrip.
- President Joseph Kasavubu of the Congo suspended the parliament indefinitely, after more than half of the 137 deputies of the Central Assembly failed to appear in Léopoldville, whether out of fear of arrest or because of joining a rebellion against the Congolese government.
- The sudden eruption of the volcano Mount Villarrica killed 22 people in Chile, and left 35 others missing, after triggering an avalanche that buried the village of Coñaripe. Twenty-two people were reported killed and 35 others missing.
- Born: Laird Hamilton, American big-wave surfer and co-inventor of tow-in surfing; in San Francisco

== March 3, 1964 (Tuesday) ==
- The Kingdom of Saudi Arabia and the United Arab Republic resumed diplomatic relations after six years, following a meeting between Prince Faisal and President Nasser at the Arab Summit in Cairo.
- The Tsurugisan Quasi-National Park was founded in Japan.

== March 4, 1964 (Wednesday) ==
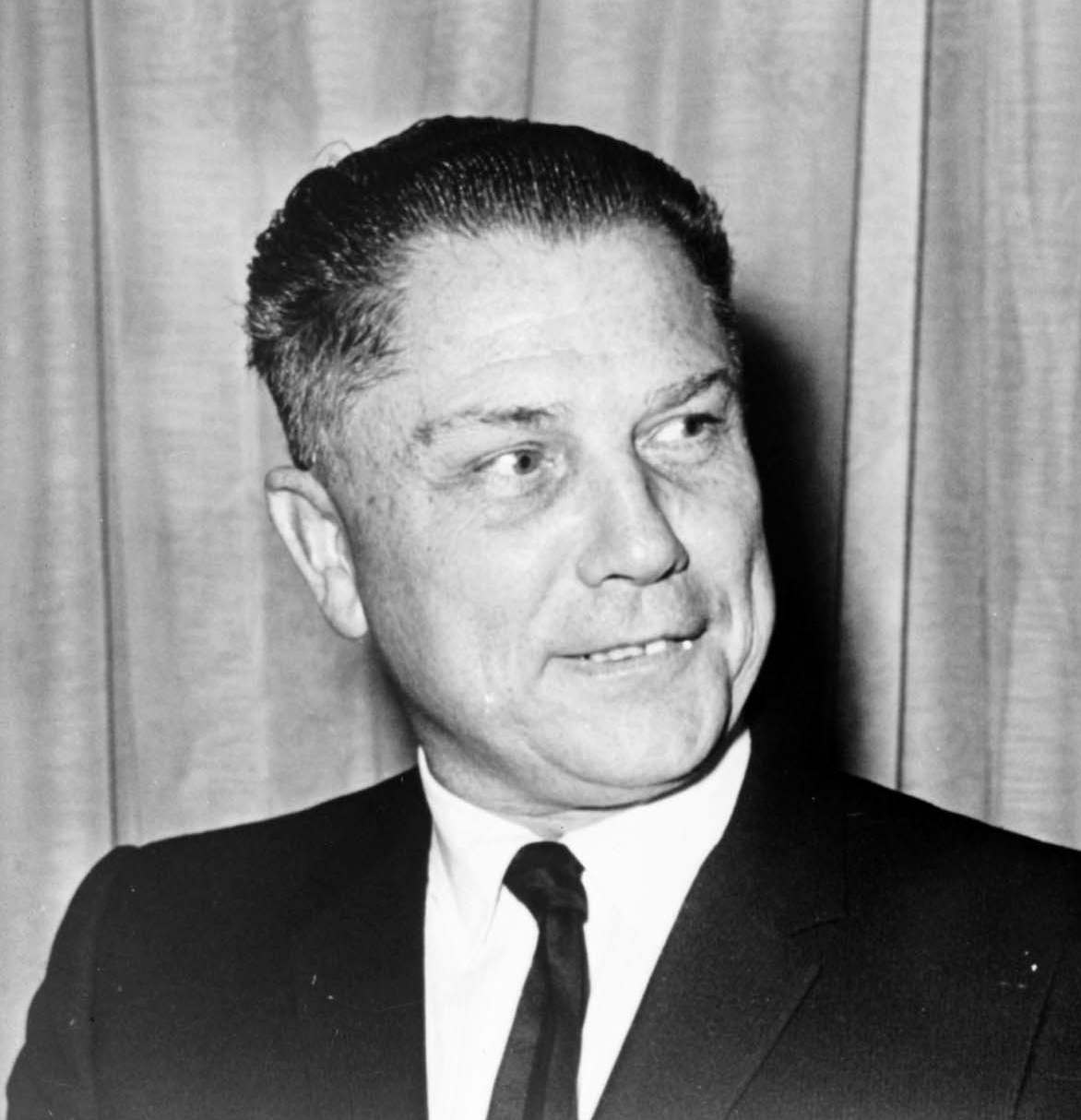
Hoffa

- Teamsters President Jimmy Hoffa was found guilty by a federal jury in Chattanooga, Tennessee on two counts of jury tampering that had happened in 1962. The conviction was the first after four previous trials on other federal charges had ended in an acquittal. Hoffa was released after posting a new bail bond for $75,000 pending the appeal of the verdict and his 8-year prison sentence. His appeals would finally be exhausted three years later, and he would begin his sentence on March 7, 1967.
- Mark Lane, an attorney from New York City, asked for and was granted the opportunity to appear before the Warren Commission for the stated purpose of representing the interests of the late Lee Harvey Oswald, who had been charged with the assassination of President John F. Kennedy. Lane, who would write the bestselling book Rush to Judgment and who would become the most well-known proponent of JFK conspiracy theories, showed the group news photographs from the assassination scene which he believed had been altered. Commission member and future U.S. President Gerald Ford told reporters later that Lane "was given a fair hearing. He put his ideas in the record, and all will be checked out."
- The United Nations Security Council unanimously adopted Resolution 186, providing for a multinational peacekeeping force for Cyprus. UNFICYP would become operational on March 27.
- Teressa Belissimo invented the Buffalo wing (officially called the "Buffalo Chicken Wing" on the menu) at The Anchor Bar in Buffalo, New York.

== March 5, 1964 (Thursday) ==
- The Republic of Zanzibar prohibited the use of the pulled rickshaw on its streets, banning the human-pulled taxi as a symbol of feudal exploitation.
- British Army troops engaged in combat in Cyprus for the first time, when two soldiers fired back at Turkish Cypriot combatants in the predominantly Turkish village of Karmi. The gunfire began after an army unit was sent to protect Greek Cypriot schoolchildren.
- Following an attempted coup in Gabon, some Gabonese mistakenly accused the United States of being a co-conspirator in the recent coup attempt that had temporarily overthrown President Leon M'Ba, and bombed the U.S. Embassy in Libreville. The explosion, which occurred at a time when the building was closed and locked, "cracked two windows, partially demolished the embassy sign and splattered mud over the front of the building."
- Gemini launch vehicle (GLV) 1 and Gemini spacecraft No. 1 were mechanically mated at complex 19.

== March 6, 1964 (Friday) ==
- Five members of the crew of the tanker Bunker Hill, including the ship's captain, were killed when the vessel exploded and sank in 300-foot (91 m) deep water in Puget Sound near the coast of Anacortes, Washington. The U.S. Coast Guard was able to rescue 25 others from icy water. The ship, which was empty at the time and would normally have carried a crew of 44, had departed and was on its way to pick up a cargo of gasoline at Portland. As a result of the accident, the National Maritime Union (NMU) would successfully lobby for inflatable life rafts to be placed on all ships owned by companies that had contracts with NMU members.
- The original version of the Soviet Union's MiG-25 supersonic jet fighter, referred to in the West as the "Foxbat", was flown for the first time. "These amazing aircraft", an author would note, "were to sustain the biggest development programme in history, leading to forty-nine versions, of which thirty-three flew and more than twenty entered service."
- The literacy test for Mississippi voters was upheld as a three-judge panel of the U.S. District Court in Jackson ruled, 2–1, that the state law did not violate the U.S. Constitution. The U.S. Department of Justice had brought suit to challenge a requirement that voters had to be, within the judgment of a county official, of good moral character and that they had to be able to read and write, and to be able to interpret selected sections of law. Historically, the literacy test had more often disenfranchised African Americans than white residents. The tests would be outlawed for federal elections by the passage of the Voting Rights Act of 1965.

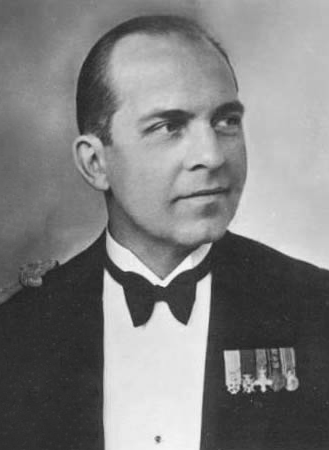
Paul I

- Died: King Paul of Greece, 62, died of post-operative complications following surgery for stomach cancer. His 23-year-old son became King Constantine II.

== March 7, 1964 (Saturday) ==
- The government of the People's Republic of China issued the new list of simplified Chinese characters, following up on the first reform of 1956, with a complete list of 2,236 revisions of traditional Chinese characters. The Jianhuazi Zongbiao required fewer strokes and were easier to write.
- Asadollah Alam resigned as Prime Minister of Iran to take the job of minister of the Shah's imperial court, and was replaced two hours later by Hassan Ali Mansur. Mansur would be assassinated less than a year later, dying on January 26, 1965.
- Born:
  - Vladimir Smirnov, Kazakhstani cross-country skiing world champion; in Shuchinsk, Kazakh SSR, Soviet Union
  - Wanda Sykes, African-American comedienne; in Portsmouth, Virginia

== March 8, 1964 (Sunday) ==
- Malcolm X, who had been suspended from the Nation of Islam, announced in New York City that he was forming a black nationalist party. "I remain a Muslim," he told reporters, "but the main emphasis of the new movement will be black nationalism as a political concept and form of social action against the white oppressors." Three days later, he incorporated his new organization as Muslim Mosque, Inc. and established a headquarters at the Hotel Theresa in the Harlem section of New York City, at 125th Street and Seventh Avenue.
- Karol Wojtyla was enthroned as the Roman Catholic Archbishop of Kraków at the Wawel Cathedral in Poland's city of Kraków. In 1978, Archbishop Wojtyla would become Pope John Paul II.
- All 30 people on a Taxader Air Lines DC-3 were killed when the airliner crashed in Colombia while flying from Pereira to Bogotá, killing the 25 passengers and five crew.
- Died: Franz Alexander, 73, Hungarian-American psychoanalyst and physician and pioneer of psychosomatic medicine and psychoanalytic criminology.

== March 9, 1964 (Monday) ==
- The first Ford Mustang rolled off the assembly line at the Ford Motor Company factory in Dearborn, Michigan. A researcher would note later that what he believed to have been the first Mustang marked for shipment (based on having the lowest vehicle identification number that had been found to exist, 100211) was sent to fill an order by the Hull-Dobbs Ford dealership in Winston-Salem, North Carolina, but added that "no record... has been discovered that indicates the VIN number of the first Mustang to roll off the line on that Monday", and that any promotional photo of the first car "typically... would picture a pre-production car purposely placed at the head of the line".
- A woman found on a sidewalk in Tulsa, Oklahoma, was saved from death despite having a body temperature of only 59.5 °F (12 °C) on arrival at the Hillcrest Medical Center. After 90 minutes, her temperature was recorded at 67 °F (19 °C). A physician at the hospital, Dr. Edward Jenkins, credited the survival of Mrs. Marie Adams to the fact that she had been drunk and that the alcohol in her system led to an unusually quick loss of body heat and a drastic reduction in her body's need for oxygen. Mrs. Adams's injuries were limited to numb fingertips and pain in her throat and chest.
- The United States Supreme Court ruled in New York Times Co. v Sullivan that under the First Amendment, a state was limited in its power to award damages for libel arising from criticism of public officials acting within the scope of their duties. L. B. Sullivan, the police commissioner of Montgomery, Alabama, had been awarded US$500,000 in damages in a libel suit against The New York Times after the Times had run an advertisement on March 29, 1960, accusing Sullivan of overseeing "a wave of terror" against African-Americans.
- Born: Valérie Lemercier, French actress and filmmaker; in Dieppe
- Died: Paul von Lettow-Vorbeck, 93, General of the Imperial German Army during World War One, and known as Der Löwe von Afrika ("The Lion of Africa") for his defense of Germany's African colonies against a much larger force of Allied troops.

== March 10, 1964 (Tuesday) ==
- Henry Cabot Lodge Jr., the U.S. Ambassador to South Vietnam, won the Republican primary in New Hampshire, the first contest in the race for the Party's nomination for the candidate for President of the United States. Because he had waited until the week before to file his candidacy, Lodge's name was not on the printed ballots and he won as a write-in candidate, receiving 33,007 written votes, compared to 20,692 for Barry Goldwater and 19,504 for Nelson Rockefeller. Richard M. Nixon, though not on the ballot, got 15,587 write-ins. Lodge, a native of nearby Massachusetts, was believed by political commentators to have the advantage of being a New England politician. Despite the win, Lodge told reporters in Saigon that he had no plans to return to the United States to campaign.
- The Soviet Union won the first computer chess game in the first competition between the U.S. and the USSR, Moscow's ITEP system checkmating Stanford University's Kotok-McCarthy program on its 19th move. Four games, played simultaneously, had started on November 21, with the each side's move being telegraphed to the other for a programmed response. The Soviets would win a second game, and the other two would end in a draw, giving the USSR a 3 points to 1 victory.
- Soviet military forces shot down an unarmed American RB-66 reconnaissance bomber that had strayed into East Germany. The three crew members parachuted to safety and were arrested by Soviet soldiers near the East German village of Gardelegen. 1st Lieutenant Harold W. Welch, who had fractured an arm and a leg, would be released March 21, and U.S. Army captains David I. Holland and Melvin J. Kessler would be set free on March 27.
- Voters in the United Arab Republic (Egypt) chose from 1,648 candidates for the 350 elective seats of the National Assembly. The unicameral legislature had two deputies for each of its 175 electoral districts and an additional 10 members appointed by President Gamal Abdel Nasser.
- Voters in New Hampshire overwhelmingly approved the first legal state lottery in the United States since 1895, with 114,987 in favor and only 31,327 against. The format for the New Hampshire Sweepstakes had already been arranged and printed in advance of the vote, with the first sweepstakes ticket ready to go on sale two days later.
- Born:
  - Prince Edward, the fourth (and youngest) child of Queen Elizabeth II of the United Kingdom and her husband Prince Philip, Duke of Edinburgh; in Buckingham Palace
  - Neneh Cherry, Swedish singer; in Stockholm

== March 11, 1964 (Wednesday) ==
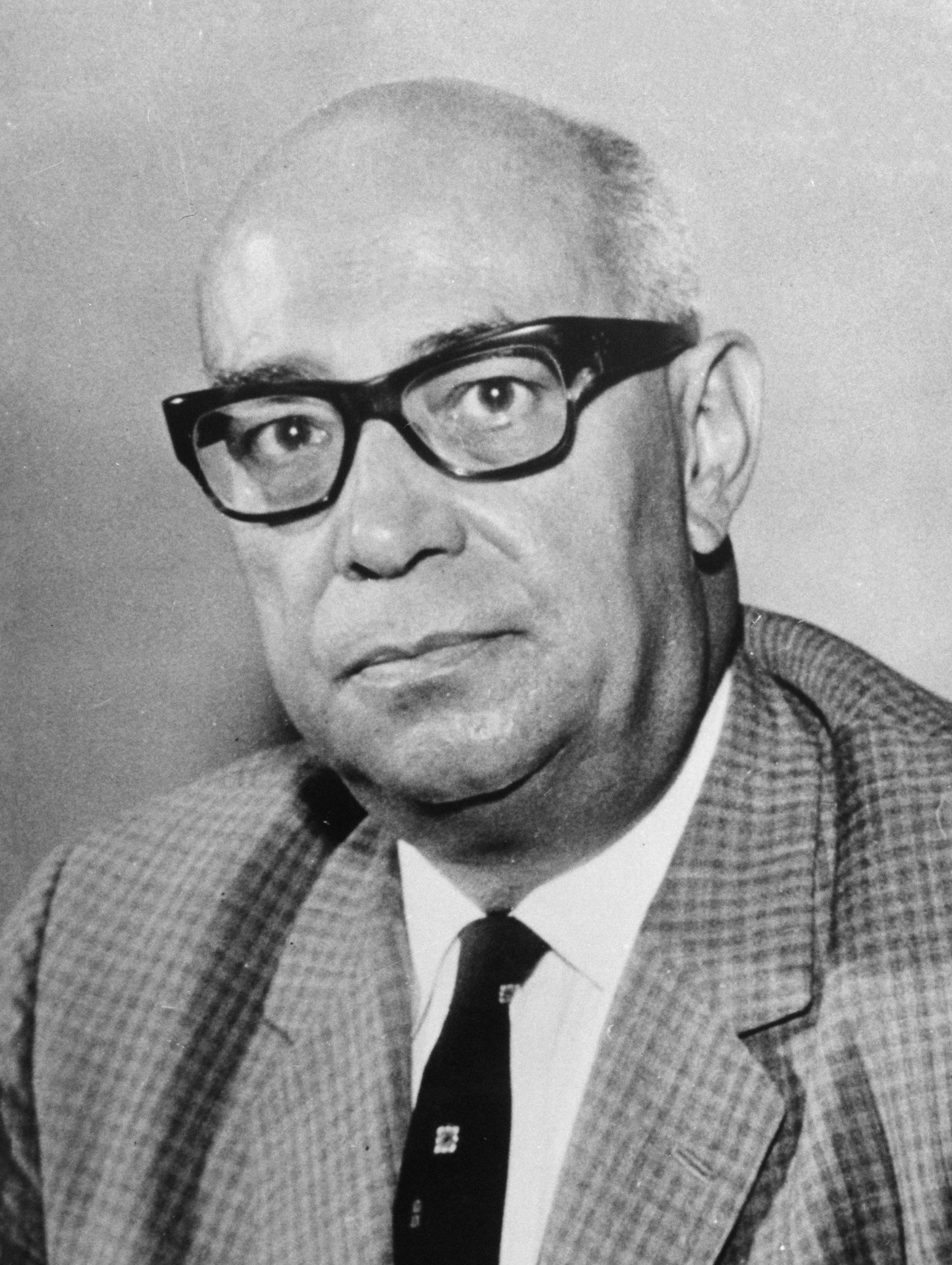
Leoni

- Raúl Leoni was inaugurated as President of Venezuela, becoming "the first democratically elected president of Venezuela to succeed another so elected." Delegates from 50 nations were on hand in Caracas to watch outgoing president Rómulo Betancourt hand over the presidential sash to Leoni at the end of Betancourt's five-year term.
- President of Finland Urho Kekkonen left Poland and began a state visit to the Estonian SSR in the Soviet Union as the guest of General Secretary Leonid Brezhnev. It marked the reopening of relations between Finland and the USSR.
- The Trident jet airliner made its first commercial flight, flying from London to Copenhagen for British European Airways (BEA). Regular service would begin on April 1.
- Gene Roddenberry wrote a 16-page proposal for a science fiction television show that he tentatively titled "Star Trek".
- At the 21st Golden Globe Awards, award winners included Sidney Poitier, Leslie Caron and Elia Kazan.
- Born:
  - Shane Richie, English comedian, actor, and singer; in Harlesden, London
  - Leena Lehtolainen, Finnish crime novelist; in Vesanto, Northern Savonia
- Died: Cleo Madison, 80, American silent film actress

== March 12, 1964 (Thursday) ==
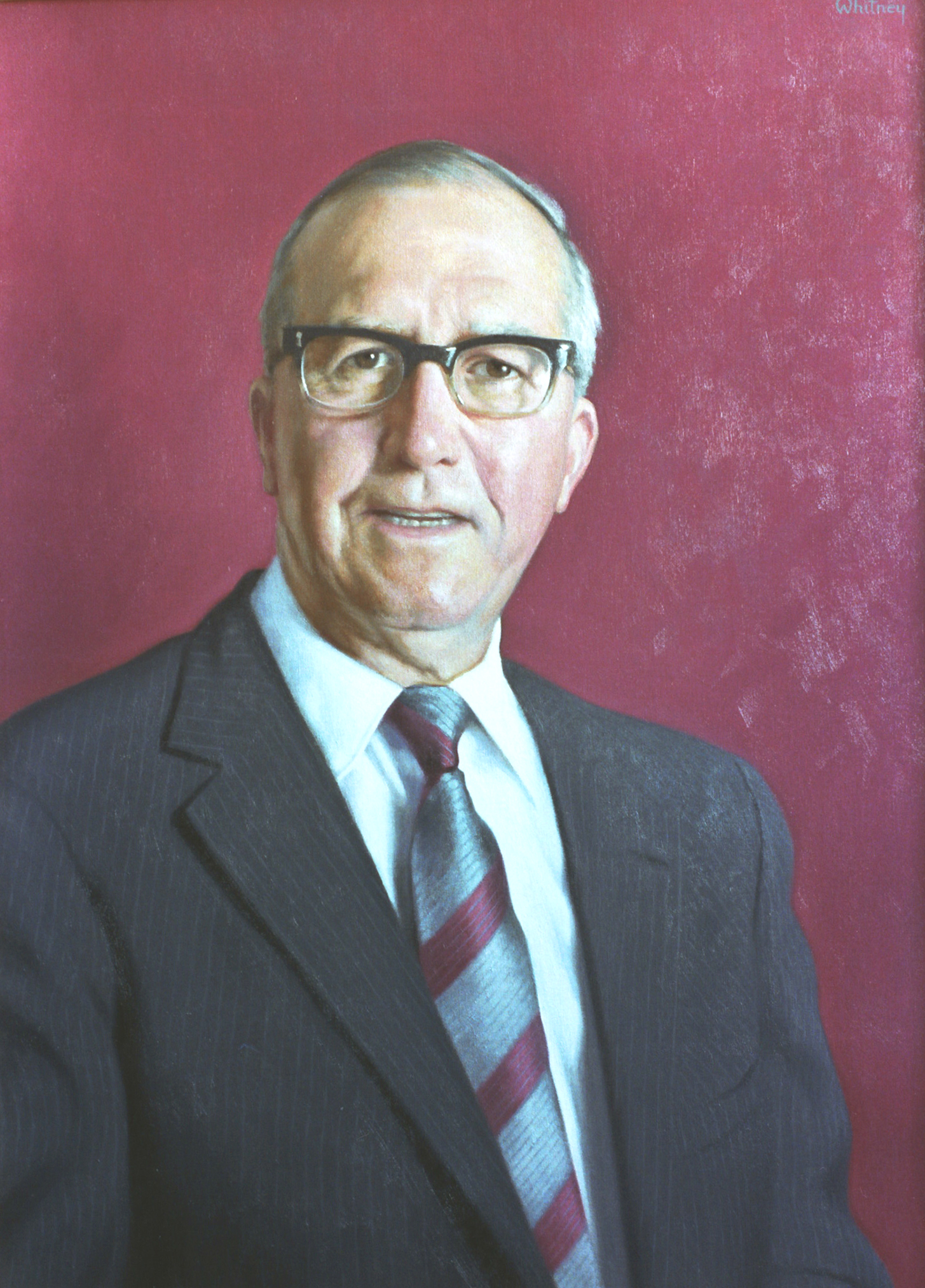
Lottery ticket buyer King

- John W. King, the Governor of New Hampshire, paid three dollars at the Rockingham Park racetrack in Salem, to buy the first state lottery ticket legally sold in the United States in the 20th century. Governor King purchased ticket number 0000001 for the New Hampshire Sweepstakes, two days after voters had approved lottery sales tickets at the state's two racetracks and 49 state operated liquor stores. On the first day of sales, 3,600 people hoping to win $100,000 (on September 12) bought tickets. Starting on July 15, the random drawing of 332 tickets would take place to link a name to one of the 332 racehorses registered at the Park, followed by five more drawings before 11 of the horses would run at Rockingham. In all, six people, randomly associated with the winning horse, would each receive $100,000 before taxes.
- The U.S. House of Representatives voted against raising their salaries by 45 percent (from $22,500 to $32,500 annually), declining, 184–222, to approve a bill that would have raised the salaries of 1.7 million other U.S. government employees. While the original intention was to have the measure made subject to a voice vote, where it would not be clear which individual Congress members wanted to give themselves pay raises, about one half of those present supported a motion to put the matter to a roll call vote. For the record, Democrats supported the measure 149 to 86, while the Republican vote was only 35 for and 136 against.
- Edward Z. Gray, Advanced Manned Missions Director in the Office of Manned Space Flight, asked Langley Research Center Director Charles J. Donlan to prepare a Project Development Plan for the Manned Orbital Research Laboratory. This plan was needed as documentation for any possible decision to initiate an orbital research laboratory project. (Gray had also asked Manned Spacecraft Center to submit similar plans for an Apollo X, an Apollo Orbital Research Laboratory, and a Large Orbital Research Laboratory.)
- Symphony in D for Cello and Orchestra, by English composer Benjamin Britten, was given its first performance. Britten conducted the Moscow Philharmonic Orchestra in the debut of his work and dedicated it to Russian cellist Mstislav Rostropovich.
- Died: Abbas al-Aqqad, 74, Egyptian journalist, poet and philosopher

== March 13, 1964 (Friday) ==
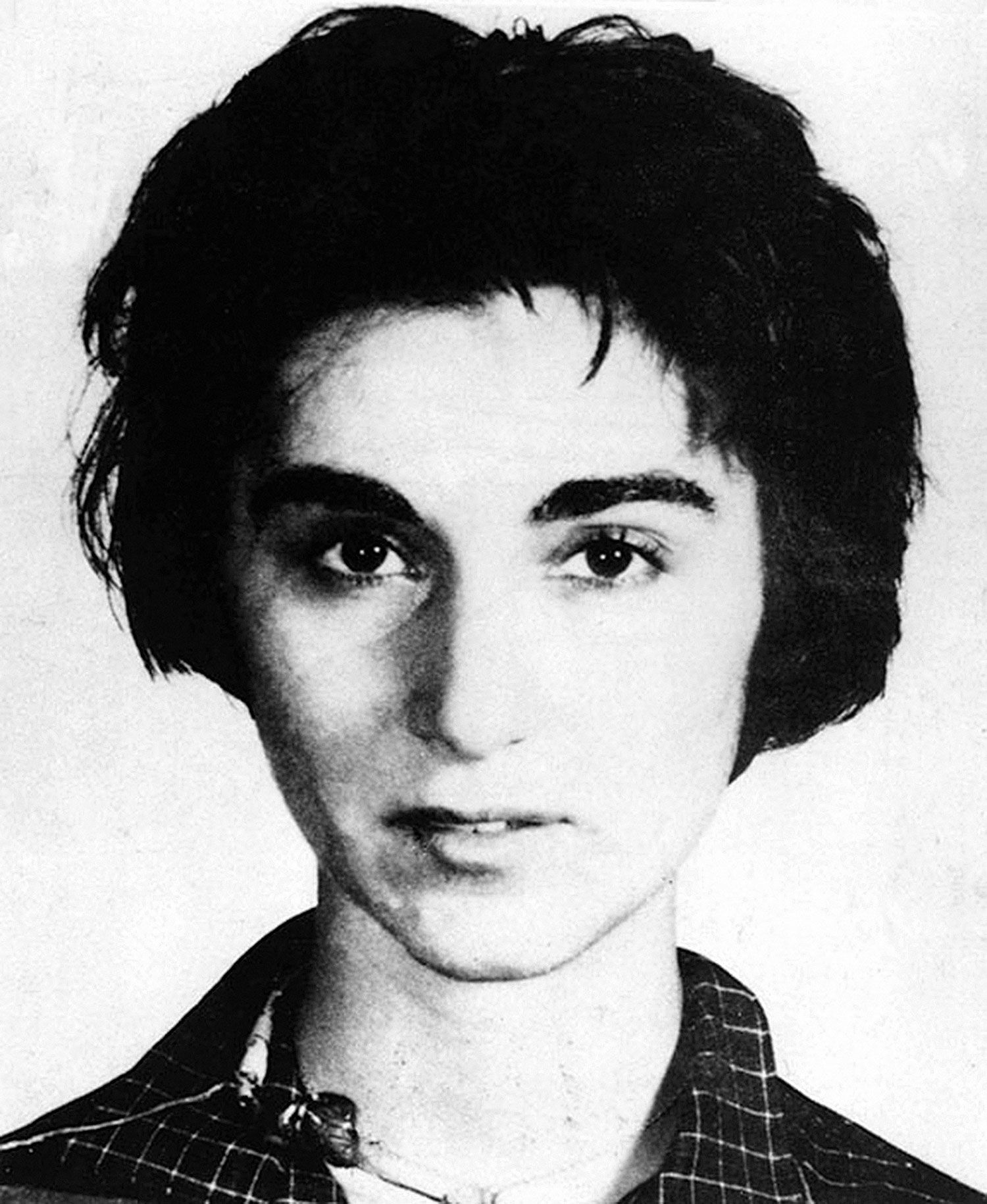
Miss Genovese

- A cautionary tale in "not wanting to get involved" happened when the murder of Kitty Genovese took place outside her apartment building in the upper-middle-class neighborhood of Kew Gardens in the New York borough of Queens. New York Police Department investigators were dumbfounded to discover that 38 different "respectable, law-abiding citizens" admitted that they had witnessed the crime, but that none of them had telephoned the police until more than half an hour later, after the killer had returned to the scene a third time to stab 28-year old Catherine Genovese to death. Miss Genovese, the manager of a bar, was returning from work when she was attacked. Forty-two years later, a researcher would write in American Heritage magazine, "The true number of eyewitnesses was not 38 but 6 or 7," and added that "The Times article that incited all this industry about an urban horror was almost certainly a misleading account of what happened." A month later, Winston Moseley would confess to killing Miss. Genovese and two other women. Moseley would be given a sentence of death, later commuted to life imprisonment, and would live 52 more years after the murder, dying inside the Clinton Correctional Facility in New York on March 28, 2016, at the age of 81.
- A 65-man patrol of the Peruvian Army came under attack from a tribe of Coquima Indians as it attempted to follow smugglers near the Amazon basin jungles. At the Department of Loreto, near the Peruvian side of the Yavarí River marking the boundary between Peru and Brazil, one soldier was killed by a poison-tipped arrow when his unit was ambushed, and another was killed by an arrow the next day. The Indian casualties, caused by Peruvian gunfire, bombs, rockets and napalm, were reported to be 33 dead.
- Brazil nationalized the six remaining privately owned oil refineries in the South American nation, and in a separate decree, authorized government seizure of all unused farm lands that were adjacent to highways, railroad lines and canals. The decrees were signed by President João Goulart in front of a mass gathering of 200,000 people outside the Central Brazilian Railroad station in Rio de Janeiro, and left military leaders with the conclusion that they would need to remove Goulart from office.

== March 14, 1964 (Saturday) ==
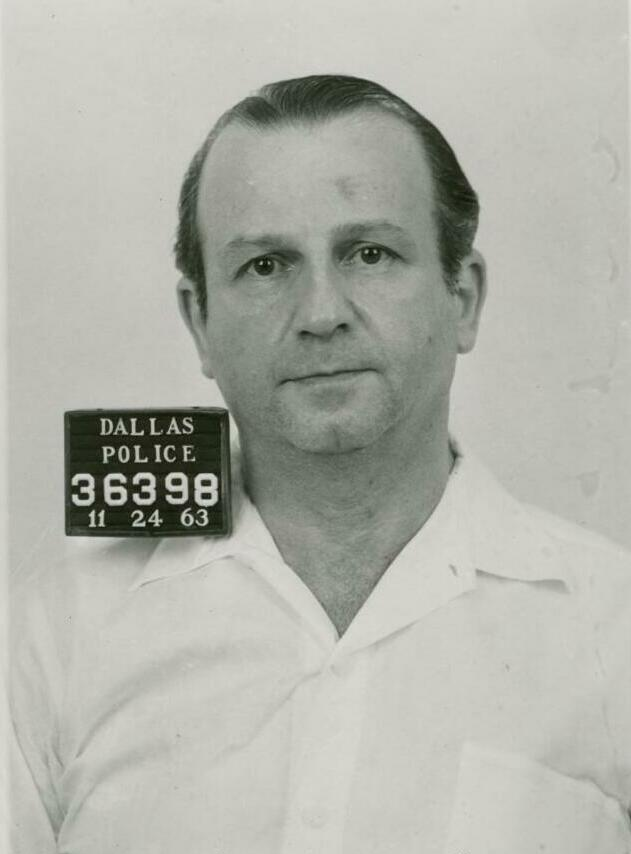
Jack Ruby

- A jury in Dallas, Texas, found Jack Ruby guilty of murdering Lee Harvey Oswald, the accused assassin of U.S. president John F. Kennedy, and recommended that his punishment be execution in the electric chair. Ruby's conviction would be reversed on appeal, and he would die of cancer, in 1967, before a new trial could be held.
- The first large contingent of the multinational UNFICYP peacekeeping force for Cyprus arrived on this date, with soldiers from the Canadian Army, followed in the next three weeks by troops from Ireland, Sweden, Denmark, Finland and Austria.
- The 2nd Daily Mirror Trophy motor race was held at Snetterton Motor Racing Circuit, England, and was won by Innes Ireland.

== March 15, 1964 (Sunday) ==
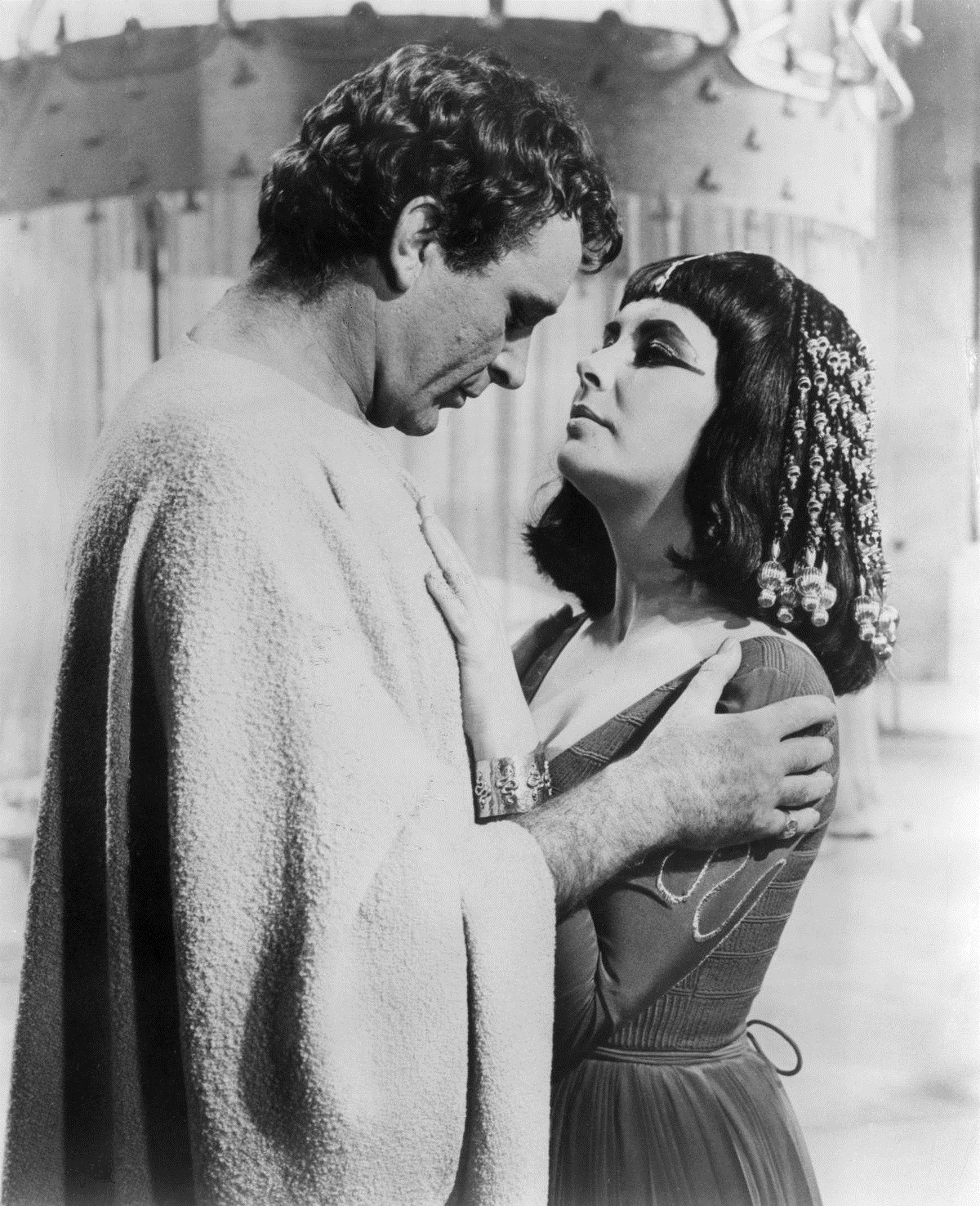
Burton and Taylor

- Actors Richard Burton and Elizabeth Taylor, who had co-starred in the 1963 film Cleopatra as lovers Mark Antony and Cleopatra, respectively, married in Montreal. The two would divorce in 1974, and then remarry in 1975 before divorcing again in 1976.
- In what one historian would describe as "the earliest expression" of "antiwar feeling among American college students" in response to the Vietnam War, students at Yale University concluded a three-day long conference on socialism that included members of the new Students for a Democratic Society, and launched the "May 2nd Movement" (M2M), and adjourned with plans for an antiwar demonstration in New York City for May 2, 1964.
- Born: Rockwell (stage name for Kennedy William Gordy), American rock musician known for his hit song "Somebody's Watching Me"; in Detroit
- Died:
  - Zbigniew Jan Dunikowski, 74, Polish born "alchemist" and convicted swindler who claimed that he had discovered a process for synthesizing gold from the silica in ordinary sand. After persuading investors to purchase shares of his Belgian company, Metallex, he was arrested in 1931 and sentenced to two years in a French prison following his conviction for fraud.
  - Abdul-Wahab Mirjan, 54, former Prime Minister of Iraq who resigned two months before the assassination of both the King of Iraq and his successor as premier.

== March 16, 1964 (Monday) ==
- Following up on his promise in the 1964 State of the Union address to raise living standards in America, U.S. President Lyndon Johnson sent a detailed message to the U.S. Congress, declaring "I have called for a national war on poverty. Our objective: total victory." Johnson, who opened by writing "We are citizens of the richest and most fortunate nation in the history of the world," asked for a $962,000,000 program to help "millions of Americans—one fifth of our people—who have not shared in the abundance which has been granted to most of us, and on whom the gates of opportunity have been closed."
- Dundee's "Royal Arch", originally erected in the 1850s to commemorate a visit to the city by Queen Victoria and her husband, Prince Albert, was demolished to make way for the construction of the Tay Road Bridge.
- Born: Gore Verbinski, American film director; in Oak Ridge, Tennessee
- Died: Lino Enea Spilimbergo, 67, Argentinian artist

== March 17, 1964 (Tuesday) ==
- What would become known as the "domino theory" became the basis for American policy on Vietnam, after U.S. President Johnson approved National Security Action Memorandum 288 and the recommendations made to him by Secretary of Defense Robert S. McNamara. "We seek an independent non-Communist South Vietnam," McNamara wrote, adding that "unless we can achieve this objective... almost all of Southeast Asia will probably fall under Communist dominance", starting with South Vietnam, Laos, and Cambodia, followed by Burma and Malaysia. "Thailand might hold for a period with our help, but would be under grave pressure. Even the Philippines would become shaky, and the threat to India to the west, Australia and New Zealand to the south, and Taiwan, Korea, and Japan to the north and east would be greatly increased."
- Joan Merriam Smith, a 27-year-old test pilot from Long Beach, California, departed from Oakland at 1:01 in the afternoon in a quest to become the first woman to fly solo around the world.
- Born:
  - Rob Lowe, American film actor; in Charlottesville, Virginia
  - Regal Gleam, American thoroughbred racehorse and 1966 American Champion Two-Year-Old Filly (d. 1976)

== March 18, 1964 (Wednesday) ==
- In a private speech to American diplomats, Thomas C. Mann, the U.S. Under-Secretary of State for Inter-American Affairs, announced a reversal of American foreign policy in the Western Hemisphere. The U.S. Ambassadors to the nations in Latin America had been summoned to Washington for an observance of the third anniversary of President Kennedy's Alliance for Progress initiative, and Mann set aside the American policy of refusing to recognize or aid nations where dictatorships operated in place of democratic government. Henceforward, American policy would be nonintervention in the internal affairs of Latin American republics, and an emphasis on promoting economic growth, opposing the spread of Communism, and protecting American investments. The New York Times would reveal the details of the secret meeting and dub the change in policy the "Mann Doctrine".
- Approximately 50 Moroccan students broke into the embassy of Morocco in the Soviet Union and staged an all‐day sit-in protesting against the sentencing of 11 people to death for the alleged assassination attempt of Moroccan King Hassan II.
- The Soviet Union launched the technology demonstration satellite Kosmos 26 from the Mayak Launch Complex at Kapustin Yar.
- Died:
  - Joseph T. O'Callahan, 58, American Jesuit priest and U.S. Navy Commander who became (in 1946) the first Navy chaplain (and the first chaplain since the Civil War) to win the Medal of Honor."Chaplain Who Won Medal Of Honor Dies", The News Tribune (Tacoma, Washington), March 19, 1964, p.1
  - Norbert Wiener, 69, American mathematician and developer of cybernetics

== March 19, 1964 (Thursday) ==
- Jerrie Mock, a 38-year-old housewife in Columbus, Ohio, departed from that city's airport on her quest to become the first woman to fly solo around the world, two days after Joan Merriam Smith had departed on the same venture. For the next 29 days, readers of newspapers worldwide would follow the progress of Mrs. Mock and Mrs. Smith to see who would complete the task first. Mrs. Smith's two-day start was offset by engine trouble that delayed her in Dutch Guiana for a week. Ultimately, Jerrie Mock would complete the circumnavigation of the world first, landing her "Spirit of Columbus" on April 17 at 9:36 in the evening in Columbus, after a journey of 22,858.8 miles (36,787.7 km) and 21 stops. Mrs. Smith had gotten as far as Australia, landing at Darwin on April 17. Mrs. Smith, who had repeatedly encountered engine trouble, would become the second woman to fly solo around the world, landing back at Oakland on May 12.
- Sir Edward Boyle, the British Minister of Education, announced that his Ministry had officially approved the 43-symbol Initial Teaching Alphabet for schoolchildren just beginning to read. The I.T.A. had been devised by another member of parliament, James Pitman, who said that as many as 10,000 British children (and 2,000 American children) had learned to read using the alternative alphabet since its introduction as an experiment by the University of London in September 1961.
- The British government announced plans to build three new towns in South East England to provide housing near overpopulated London. One of these was centred on the village of Milton Keynes in north Buckinghamshire.
- The Foreign Ministry of Luxembourg announced that its head of state, the Grand Duchess Charlotte, would soon abdicate after a reign of 45 years, and turn the monarchy over to her 43-year-old son, Jean.
- Troops from South Vietnam, accompanied by U.S. Army advisers, mistakenly crossed the border into Cambodia and attacked the village of Chanthrea, killing 17 civilians.
- The American communications satellite Relay II made the first transmission of a live television broadcast from Japan to the United States.
- In the United Kingdom, power dispute talks broke down and it was feared that supply disruptions would follow industrial action.

== March 20, 1964 (Friday) ==
- Anti-Muslim rioting broke out in the Indian steel-manufacturing city of Rourkela, located in the Orissa state (now called Odisha), after a trainload of Hindu refugees arrived from East Pakistan (now Bangladesh) and described atrocities that had befallen them at the hands of Bengali Muslims. At least 115 people were killed during the night, mostly Muslims who were stabbed or hacked to death. The violence spread into the states of West Bengal, Bihar, Madhya Pradesh, Jharkhand and Chhattisgarh. By the time that the Indian Army suppressed the mayhem, the official death toll after three weeks was 346, although "unofficial estimates by informed sources put the death total at possibly 700" and the government of Pakistan said that as many as 2,000 Muslims had been massacred.
- The Supreme Soviet of the Soviet Union passed a decree that provided for a more liberal system of parole and probation, allowing "conditional release from deprivation of freedom" for well-behaved and able-bodied prisoners after they had served only one-fifth of their sentences. An inmate who "demonstrated the desire to redeem his guilt through honest work" was required to stay within an administrative region designated by the government, and to work on construction projects such as chemical plants, oil refineries or factories.
- The Houston Press, one of the three daily newspapers serving Houston, Texas, published its final issue. Founded on September 25, 1911, the Press was later acquired by the Scripps-Howard chain and was sold to the rival Houston Chronicle.
- ESRO, the European Space Research Organization and a precursor to the European Space Agency, was established in accordance with an agreement signed on June 14, 1962.
- Died: Brendan Behan, 41, Irish poet, novelist and dramatist

== March 21, 1964 (Saturday) ==
- The U.S. Joint Chiefs of Staff presented President Johnson with its recommendations for Operation Square Dance, a plan to destroy Cuba's entire sugar crop in order to cause the collapse of its socialist government led by prime minister Fidel Castro. President Johnson refused to approve the operation because of the hardship upon the general population, and would discontinue all sabotage plans against Cuba less than three weeks later.
- In San Diego, California, the first of the SeaWorld theme parks opened. With a few captive dolphins and sea lions, and six attractions on 22 acres (8.9 ha) of land, SeaWorld began as the project of four investors, George Millay, Milton C. Shedd, Ken Norris, and David Demott, and would attract 400,000 visitors in its first year of operation.
- The UCLA Bruins won the NCAA basketball championship, beating the Duke University Blue Devils, 98–83, in Kansas City, Missouri. During the 1963–1964 season, the Bruins won all 26 of their regular games and the four playoff games.
- "Non ho l'età", sung by Gigliola Cinquetti (music by Nicola Salerno, lyrics by Mario Panzeri), won the Eurovision Song Contest 1964 for Italy.

== March 22, 1964 (Sunday) ==
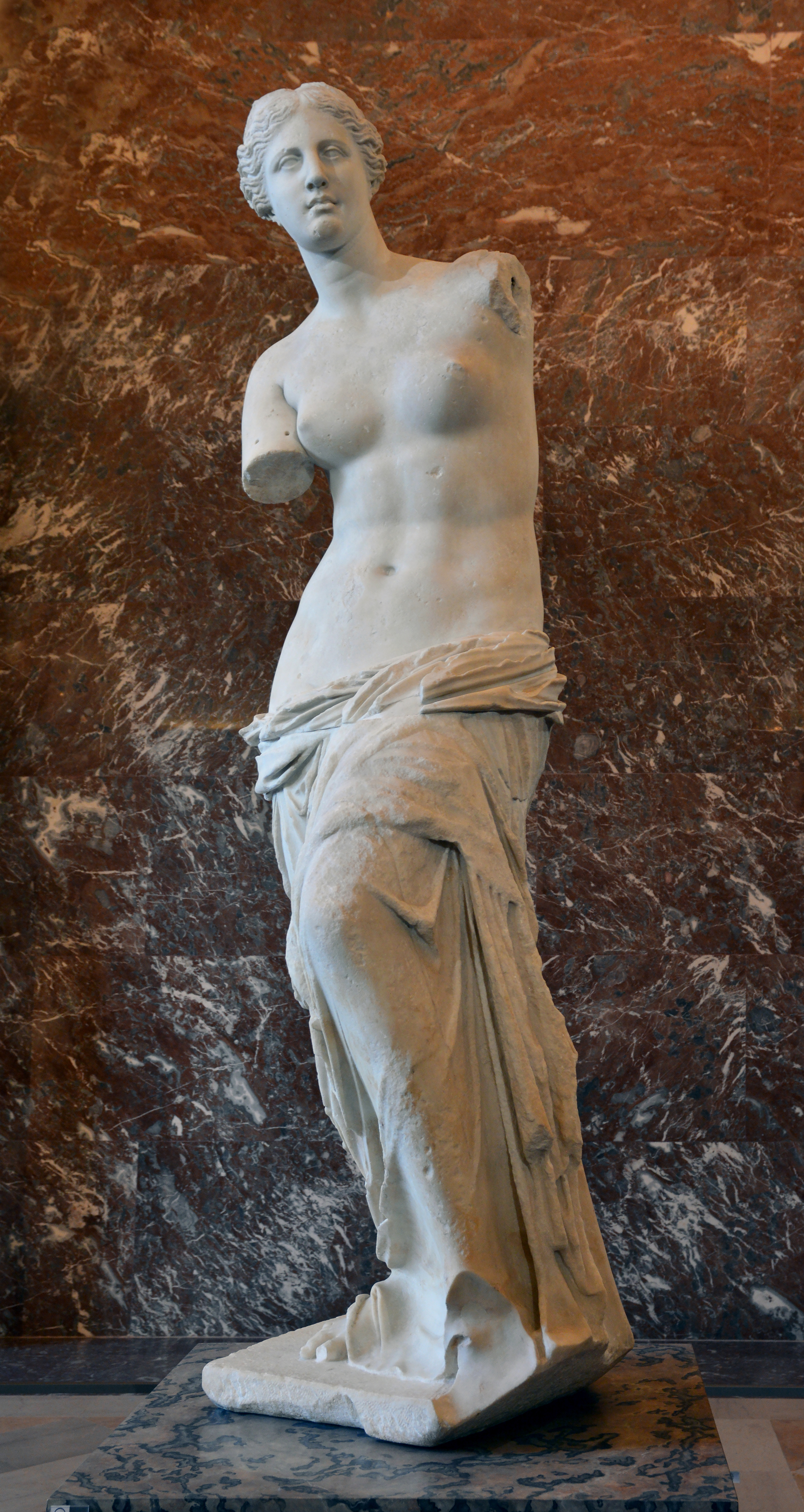
The Venus de Milo damaged further in shipping

- Venus de Milo, the famed 2000-year-old Greek statue, was found to be slightly damaged as it arrived in Yokohama for transfer to the National Museum of Western Art in Tokyo on loan from the Louvre Museum in Paris. Already missing both of its arms, the statue was found to have sustained four chips "from the folds of her robe below the hip on the left side". Venus de Milo had been shipped from Marseille on February 18 on board the French ocean liner Vietnam.
- PIDE, the security police for the dictatorship in Portugal, announced in a press release that it had arrested several extremists who were plotting to overthrow Portuguese Prime Minister António de Oliveira Salazar and President Francisco Franco of Spain. According to the police, the plotters were going to unite the two neighboring republics into a single Union of Iberia, to be ruled by a former Portuguese presidential candidate, General Umberto Delgado.
- The 1964 USAC Championship Car season began at Avondale, Arizona, with A. J. Foyt winning the Phoenix 100.
- Carol Mann won the 1964 Women's Western Open golf tournament in Florida.

== March 23, 1964 (Monday) ==
- At Riyadh in Saudi Arabia, Crown Prince Faisal convened a meeting of the other brothers of King Saud of Saudi Arabia, tribal leaders and the 34 principal Muslim patriarchs, to discuss the King's demands for a full restoration of powers that had been taken from him in 1958. The council of civil and religious leaders discussed the problems with the King and agreed that he needed to be stripped of all remaining authority. At the end of the week, King Saud reluctantly agreed to the council's decree, which took away "his armed protection, most of his revenue and half his income", but allowed him to remain as a figurehead monarch.
- The first United Nations Conference on Trade and Development (UNCTAD) opened with a session at Geneva. Representatives from 120 nations attended and the conference would last for twelve weeks.
- Rock and roll singer Elvis Presley received his discharge from the U.S. Army reserve, after completion of six years of active and reserve duty.
- John Lennon's first book, In His Own Write, was published by Jonathan Cape and would become a bestseller in the United Kingdom.
- Born:
  - David Camm, former trooper of the Indiana State Police who spent 13 years in prison after twice being wrongfully convicted of the murders of his wife, Kimberly, and his two young children at their home in Georgetown, Indiana, on September 28, 2000; in New Albany, Floyd County
  - John Pinette, American stand-up comedian, actor, and Broadway performer (d. 2014); in Boston
- Died:
  - Torstein Raaby, 45, Norwegian resistance fighter and explorer, died from heart failure during a polar exploration in Greenland
  - Peter Lorre, 59, Hungarian-born American film and TV actor formerly known as Laszlo Lowenstein

== March 24, 1964 (Tuesday) ==
- The government of Turkey announced the deportation of all citizens of Greece who had been permitted to reside and work in Turkey, and published its first list of named individuals who were directed to leave within a week. The first group would be forced to sign a statement that they were voluntarily leaving because they had been "involved in illegal economic and political activities", and would depart Istanbul on March 29 "with very little money and few belongings".
- Edwin O. Reischauer, the United States Ambassador to Japan, was stabbed and seriously wounded by a deranged teenager outside the U.S. Embassy in Tokyo. Norikazu Shioya told police that his motive was to call attention to the problems of co-education, which Shioya saw as a threat to Japanese society, and cited one offense as "making girls and boys sit together at the same desk".
- Dutchman, an off-Broadway play by African-American playwright LeRoi Jones (later Amiri Baraka) premiered at the Cherry Lane Theatre in New York's Greenwich Village. It would win the Obie Award for Best American Play later in the year and be turned into a film in 1967.

== March 25, 1964 (Wednesday) ==
- Egypt's President Gamal Abdel Nasser proclaimed the new constitution of the United Arab Republic in force, defining the UAR as "a democratic socialist state", and giving himself stronger executive powers in a state with one political party, the Arab Socialist Union.
- The Guardianship of Infants Act 1964 was signed into law in Ireland.
- Mission plans for the first Agena rendezvous flight were discussed at a meeting of the Gemini Project Office's Trajectories and Orbits Panel, which accepted a proposal by astronaut and engineer Edwin "Buzz" Aldrin, then of Air Force Space Systems Division, to utilize concentric rather than tangential orbits. Aldrin's plan was that it provided the greatest use of onboard backup techniques in case of failure in the inertial guidance system platform, computer, or radar.

== March 26, 1964 (Thursday) ==
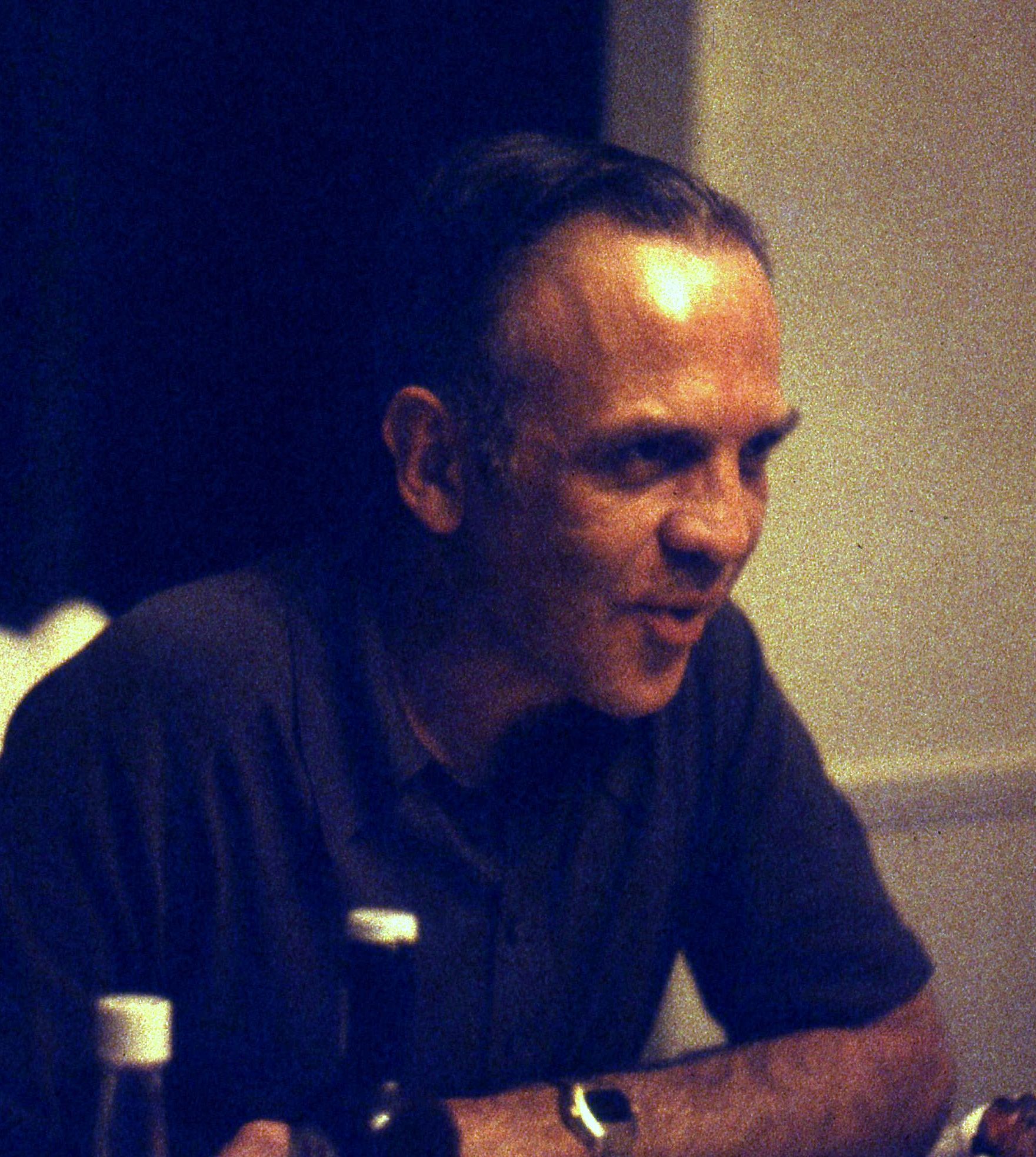
Jim Thompson

- U.S. Army Captain Floyd J. "Jim" Thompson was captured by the Viet Cong in South Vietnam after he and his pilot, Richard L. Whitesides, were shot down over the Quang Tri Province, near the village of A Vao. Whitesides was killed in the crash, while Thompson was sent to a prison camp in North Vietnam, where he would spend almost nine years in captivity. Released on March 16, 1973, ten days short of the anniversary of his capture, Captain Thompson remains the longest serving American prisoner of war.
- You Only Live Twice, Ian Fleming's twelfth James Bond novel, and the last of his novels to be published during his lifetime, was first published by Jonathan Cape.
- Died: Henry Monck-Mason Moore, 77, British colonial administrator who served as the first Governor-General of Ceylon (now Sri Lanka) after it was granted independence in 1948 and until 1949. Moore had previously served as Ceylon's Governor (1944–1948), and as Governor of Sierra Leone (1934–1937) and Governor of Kenya (1940–1944).

== March 27, 1964 (Friday) ==
- At 5:36 in the afternoon on Good Friday (0336 UTC March 28), the Great Alaskan earthquake, recorded at between 8.6 and 9.2 on the Richter scale, struck the city of Anchorage, Alaska. The tremor, the most powerful earthquake in the United States and the second most powerful in recorded history, killed 131 people and sent waves that struck the coasts of Alaska, British Columbia, Washington, Oregon, and California, as well as forcing the call for 300,000 residents of Hawaii to evacuate. At Valdez, Alaska, 24 dockworkers unloading a ship were killed when the dock was pulled underwater. Deemed unsafe, the entire town was moved to a location 4 miles (6.4 km) away.
- UNFICYP, the peacekeeping United Nations Force in Cyprus, became operational. With soldiers from nine nations, the force would reach a level of 6,238 troops and 173 police by June 1964. The force has remained on Cyprus ever since and, more than 50 years later, has 1,100 personnel on the island.
- The Soviet Union launched Kosmos 27 to make the first atmospheric probe of the planet Venus, but it failed to escape Earth orbit and would burn up in the atmosphere the next day.
- On the same day, Ariel 2, the first satellite equipped for radio astronomy, and only the second to be launched by the United Kingdom, was put into orbit.

== March 28, 1964 (Saturday) ==
- All 45 people aboard Alitalia Flight 45 were killed when the airplane crashed into the side of Mount Somma, near Mount Vesuvius, as it was preparing to land at Naples on a flight from Rome. The Vickers Viscount turboprop had departed Rome at 10:10 on the evening before Easter Sunday for the short 140 miles (230 km) flight. Flight 45 was cleared to descend from 7,000 feet to 5,000 feet and then 4,000 feet as it approached Naples and, at 10:39, flew into the 3,714 feet (1,132 m) high mountain at an altitude of 2,000 foot (610 m).
- British Royal Air Force jets, based at the Colony of Aden, bombed a Yemeni army fort at Harib in retaliation for raids by the Yemen Arab Republic on Beihan and killed 25 people. Other members of the United Nations Security Council condemned the raid, although the United Kingdom representative said that it had dropped leaflets 30 minutes before the attack and said that it had acted in self-defense.
- At 12:09 a.m. local time, 11 residents of Crescent City, California, were drowned when the town was struck by a wave caused by the Alaskan earthquake 1,400 miles (2,300 km) away. The wave struck six hours after Anchorage had been hit the day before, and the water swept inward four blocks from the coast.
- King Saud of Saudi Arabia surrendered nearly all of his power, but retained his title, after the Saudi royal family pressured him to sign a decree. Saud's younger brother Crown Prince Faisal was granted control of the oil-rich kingdom as the regent for the King.
- The Revolutionary Council that ruled Burma (now Myanmar) issued the "Law Protecting National Unity" and outlawed all political parties except for the ruling Burma Socialist Programme Party. The law would not be repealed until September 18, 1988.
- Wax likenesses of The Beatles were put on display in London's Madame Tussauds Wax Museum. The Beatles were the first pop stars to be displayed at the museum.

== March 29, 1964 (Sunday) ==
- Radio Caroline became the United Kingdom's first pirate radio station, with a signal heard at 1520 kHz on the AM band. Founded by Ronan O'Rahilly, the station began broadcasting pop music from the ship MV Caroline, formerly the Danish passenger ferry Frederica. Since the ship was anchored three miles (5 km) off the coast of Felixstowe, Suffolk, England, just outside British territorial waters, it was beyond British jurisdiction.
- Violent disturbances broke out between two youth gangs, the Mods and Rockers, at the English seaside resort of Clacton-on-Sea on Easter Sunday.

== March 30, 1964 (Monday) ==
- The game show Jeopardy!, created by Merv Griffin, made its debut at 11:30 Eastern time in the U.S., appearing on the NBC television network. Art Fleming served as the show's original host. As a reporter described the format, the show "provides answers in six categories, and three non-celebrity contestants have to supply the correct questions". Premiering half an hour earlier on the ABC network was the less successful Get the Message, hosted by Frank Buxton and described as being "that two celebrities per men-vs.-women side, instead of one, offer "Password"-like clues to contestants trying to guess words and phrases."
- A war between Somalia and Ethiopia that had started on February 7 ended after President Ibrahim Abboud of Sudan brokered a ceasefire between the two northeast African nations. With a multinational peacekeeping force from the Organisation of African Unity supporting the cessation of hostilities, Somalian and Ethiopian forces withdrew back from the existing border.
- Trans-Canada Airlines was renamed Air Canada. Canada's House of Commons had approved the legislation on March 3, in a bill sponsored by future Prime Minister Jean Chrétien from Quebec, who had championed the new name that would work equally well in the French and English languages.
- Born: Tracy Chapman, African-American singer; in Cleveland, Ohio

== March 31, 1964 (Tuesday) ==
- João Goulart, the president of Brazil, found himself having to defend his office against a military coup that began after he announced on national television that he would refuse to punish 1,425 sailors of the Brazilian Navy for a mutiny. José de Magalhães Pinto, the governor of the State of Minas Gerais, called for Goulart's ouster, and General Amaury Kruel commanded the 2d Army Corps in São Paulo in carrying out the overthrow. Units of the Brazilian military would clash for three days; on April 2, the leader of the Chamber of Deputies, Pascoal Ranieri Mazzilli, would be installed as a caretaker president and Goulart would flee to Argentina. For the next 21 years, Brazil would be ruled by a series of generals.
- The UK's Minister of Labour Joseph Godber appointed Lord Justice Pearson to chair a court of inquiry into the electrical power dispute.
- Born: Oleksandr Turchynov, Ukrainian politician, economist and screenwriter; in Dnipropetrovsk (now Dnipro)
