= Altamirano rail disaster =

1964 train crash in Argentina

Coordinates: 35°21′31″S 58°09′10″W

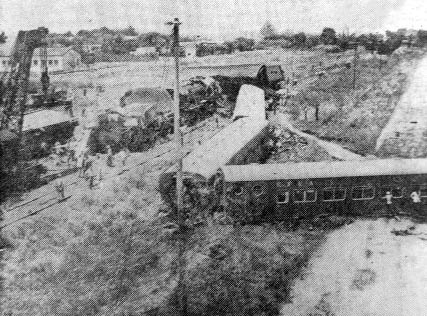

Details
- Date: February 1, 1964; 03:50
- Location: Altamirano
- Country: Argentina
- Line: Buenos Aires to Mar Del Plata
- Operator: Ferrocarriles Argentinos
- Incident type: Head-on collision
- Cause: Points failure

Statistics
- Trains: 2
- Passengers: 1040
- Deaths: 34
- Injured: 70

The Altamirano rail disaster occurred in 1964 in the city of Altamirano, Buenos Aires, Argentina, when a passenger train collided head on with a freight train, killing 34 people.

== Overview ==
On the morning of February 1, 1964, a diesel-hauled twelve-carriage holiday excursion train left the seaside resort of Mar Del Plata on its 230-mile journey north to the capital, Buenos Aires. It carried 1040 passengers returning home after their summer vacation. At Altamirano, 65 miles south of the capital the Firefly Express as it was called, travelling at 100 km/h crashed head-on with a steam-hauled freight train with a thunderous explosion.

The accident happened 250m from the station at Altamarino. Both locomotives exploded, spreading burning diesel fuel over a wide area. Most in the first carriage died quickly and those in the next two carriages were quickly consumed in the flames. Rescue workers were delayed by the muddy condition of the roads in the area following recent rainstorms. Once they arrived though they were unable to approach the wreck for several hours due to the intense heat. The police doctor, who gave an estimate of 34 deaths, admitted that the exact figure would never be known. "There is no telling how many bodies burned up in the fire". The cause of the disaster was thought to be a fault in the points (switch) which diverted the express into the path of the freight train.

== Bibliography ==
- Railroad Wrecks by Edgar A. Haine, page 144, publ 1993. ISBN 0-8453-4844-2
