= Altamirano, Argentina =

Altamirano
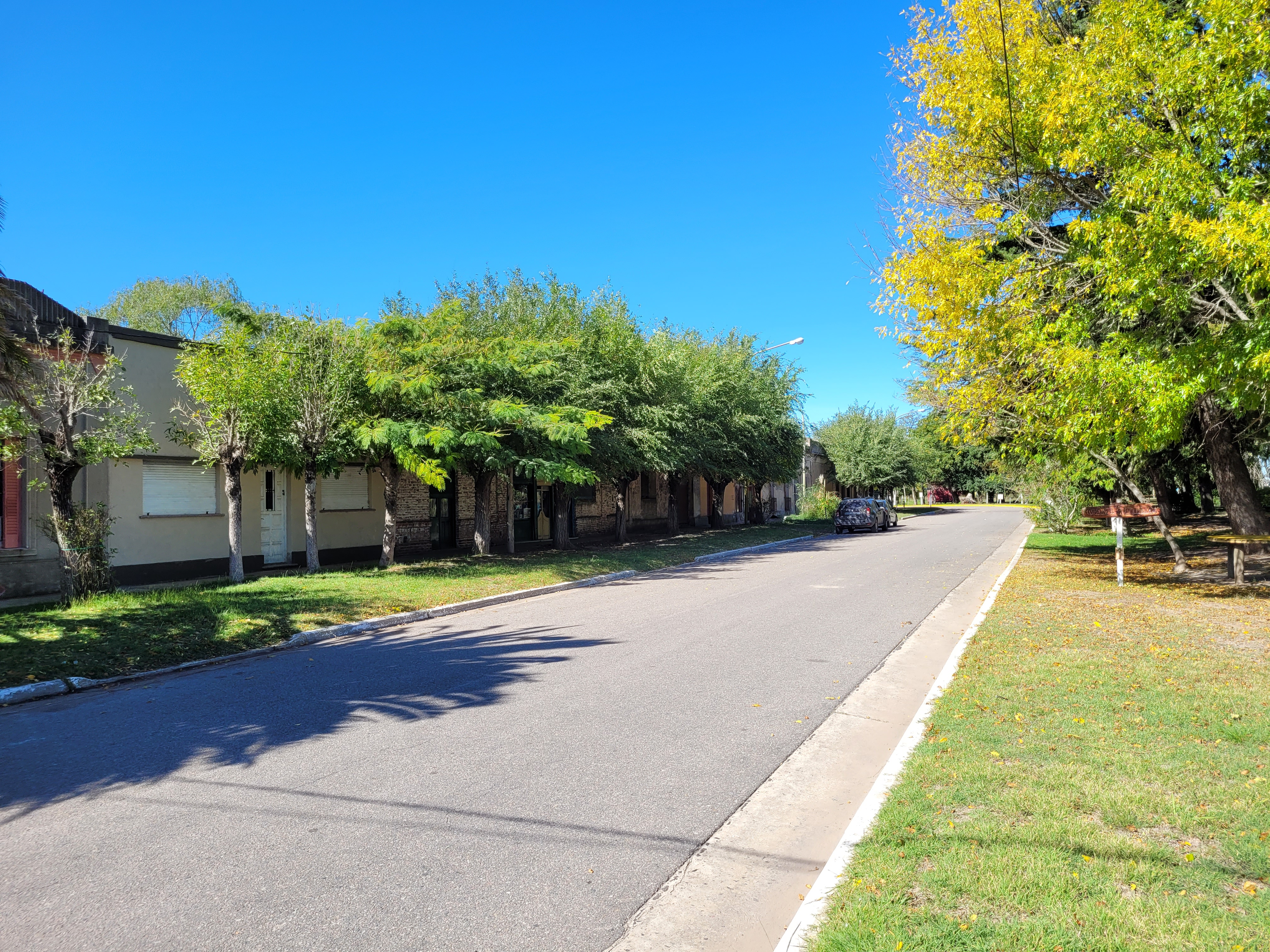

- Location in Argentina
- Coordinates: 35°21′35″S 58°09′05″W
- Country: Argentina
- Province: Buenos Aires
- Partido: Brandsen
- Elevation: 15 m (49 ft)

Population (2001 census [INDEC])
  - Total: 258
- CPA Base: B 1986
- Area code: +54 2223

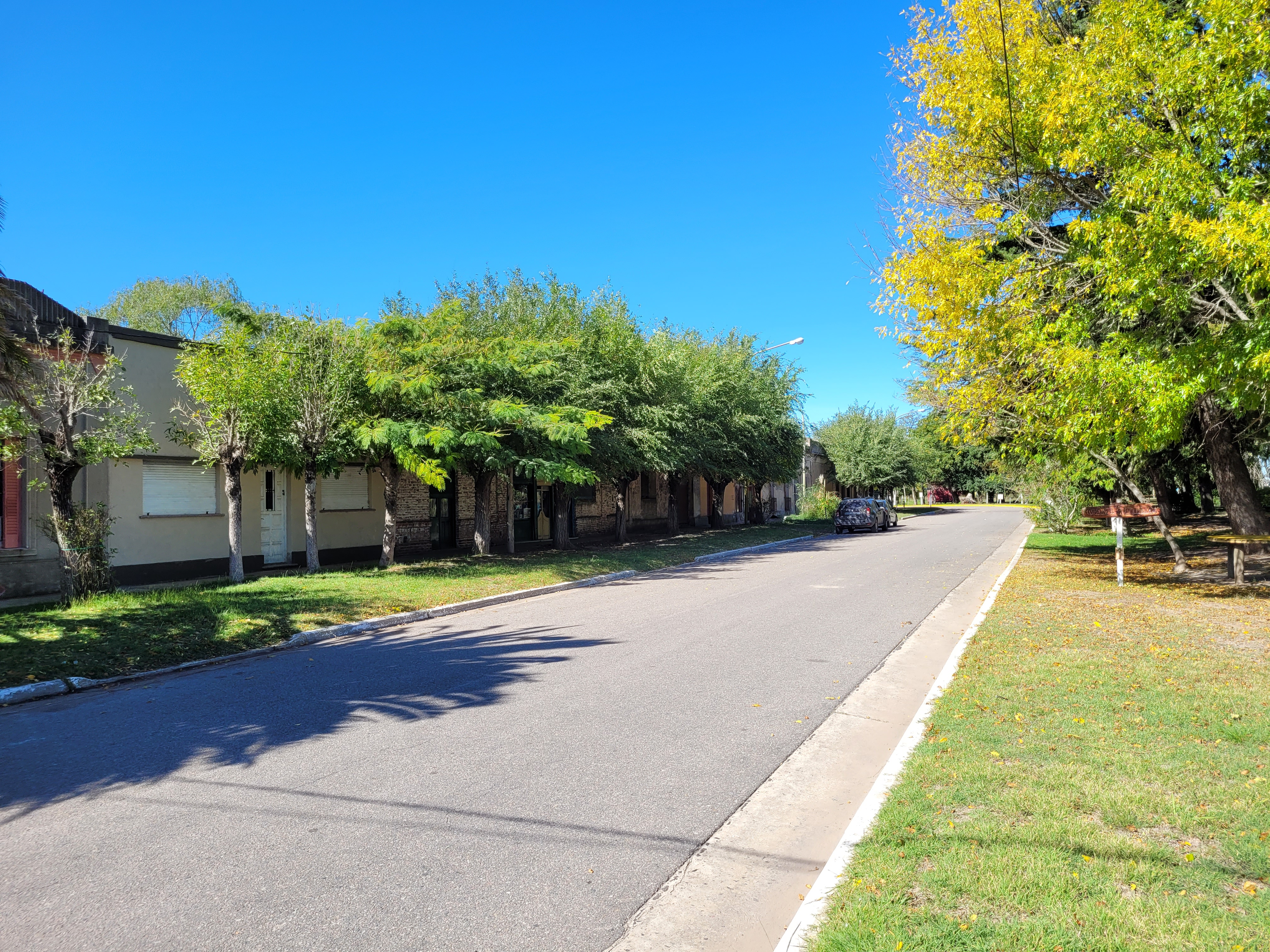
View of Altamirano, Brandsen District, Province of Buenos Aires, Argentina.

Altamirano is a town in Brandsen Partido in Buenos Aires Province, Argentina.

== Rail disaster ==
On 1 February 1964, it was the site of a head-on train collision in which 70 people were killed.

== Population ==
According to the 2001 census, carried out by the National Institute of Statistics and Census of Argentina (Spanish: Instituto Nacional de Estadística y Censos, INDEC), the population count was 258. This represents a loss of 3.7% over 268 in 1991 (the previous census).
