= Jayme Amatnecks =

Brazilian composer and conductor (born 1966)

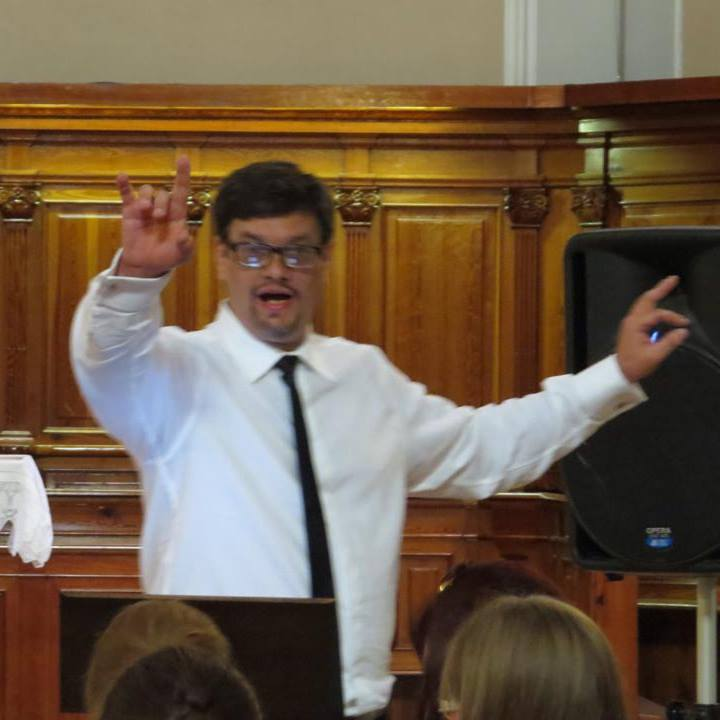
- Amatnecks conducting in Chieti, Italy, 2014
- Born: 22 December 1966 (age 59); Ponta Grossa, Paraná, Brazil
- Occupations: Composer; conductor; educator
- Style: Classical; opera; choral music

Jayme Amatnecks (born 22 December 1966, in Ponta Grossa) is a Brazilian composer and conductor. He taught at Potiguar University from 2005 to 2011 and was twice elected to Ponta Grossa's Municipal Council of Culture.

Amatnecks studied under Gabriel de Paula Machado, Lucia Passos, Hans-Gerhard Rottmann, and Hans-Joachim Koellreutter. He performed with the State University of Ponta Grossa Choir, the Unisinos Choir, and the Theatro Guaíra Choir.

== Career ==
In 1987, Amatnecks founded the children's choir at Ponta Grossa State University. In 1999, he organised the Vox Pop Choir and the Ministry of Culture's Camerata Ars Música, promoting Brazilian musical repertoire. He conducted the Symphony Orchestra of Ponta Grossa from 2002 to 2005.

From 2005 to 2011, he taught at Potiguar University, directing multiple choirs including the CEIC (Centro Educacional Imaculada Conceição) Choir, St. Cecilia Women's Choir, and the Federal Court of Rio Grande do Norte Choir. He served two terms on Ponta Grossa's Municipal Council of Culture and initiated a public school choral program that formed 83 choirs throughout the city.

"Duerme Negrito"
The traditional song "Duerme Negrito", arranged for a cappella by Emiglio Solé, performed Jayme Amatnecks and the Camerata Ars Musica

In 2013, Amatnecks served on the international jury for the VII Chorus Inside 'Advent' Festival in Rome. He led an Osvaldo Lacerda workshop during the 2014 Chorus Inside Festival in Chieti, Italy. In 2015, he conducted Duerme Negrito with Camerata Ars Música and Emiglio Solé; this performance was later included in the short film Paseo de los Melancólicos 9, 3º B: 28005 Madrid, shown at the Cannes Film Festival in 2017.

Amatnecks has received the Ponta Grossa Anita Philipovsky Prize and the State of Paraná Sower Prize for artistic merit. He has published three children's books through Arco Publishing House in Curitiba: Christmas Gloria, Tic, Tac, Zoin – A History of the Sounds, and A Gift For Mom.

On 8 December 2013, he proclaimed World Choral Singing Day at the Roman Pantheon.
