= May 1964 =

Month of 1964

<<	May 1964					>>
Su	Mo	Tu	We	Th	Fr	Sa
					1	2
3	4	5	6	7	8	9
10	11	12	13	14	15	16
17	18	19	20	21	22	23
24	25	26	27	28	29	30
31

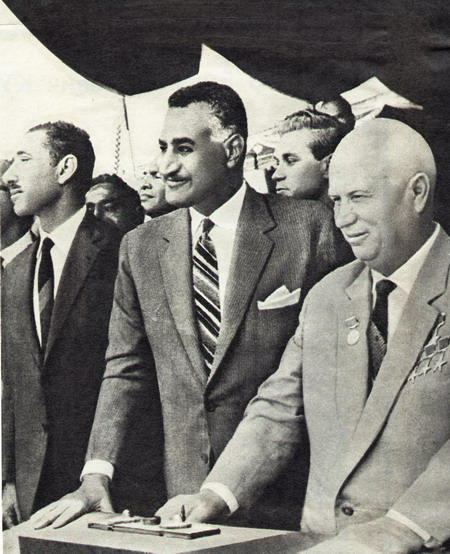
May 14, 1964: Nasser and Khrushchev press button for explosion at Aswan Dam

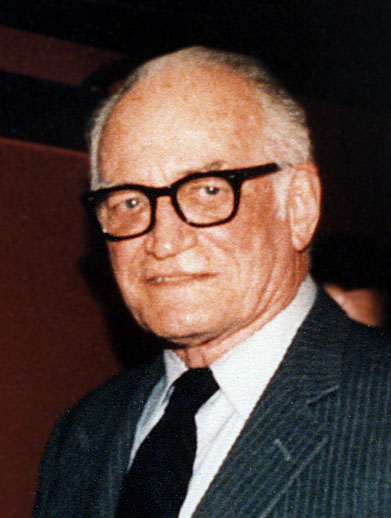
May 24, 1964: U.S. presidential candidate Goldwater suggests using nuclear weapons in Vietnam War

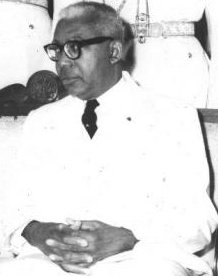
May 25, 1964: "Papa Doc" Duvalier named Haiti's "President for Life"

The following events occurred in May 1964:

== May 1, 1964 (Friday) ==
- At 4:00 a.m. at Dartmouth College, mathematics professors John G. Kemeny and Thomas E. Kurtz ran the first program written in BASIC (Beginners' All-purpose Symbolic Instruction Code), an easy to learn computer programming language that they had created. The original version had 14 statements (DATA, DEF, DIM, END, FOR, GOSUB, IF, LET, NEXT, PRINT, READ, REM, and RETURN) and nine built in DEF functions (Sin, Cos, Tan, Atn, Exp, Log, Sqr, Rnd, and Int). Kemeny would write later that "We at Dartmouth envisaged the possibility of millions of people writing their own computer programs".
- Born: Yvonne van Gennip, Netherlands speed skater, winner of three gold medals at the 1988 Winter Olympics; in Haarlem

== May 2, 1964 (Saturday) ==
- A North Vietnamese frogman sank the U.S. Navy aviation transport USNS Card after it had taken on a cargo of helicopters at Saigon. At about 5:00 in the morning, a hole was blown in the Card below the waterline, and the ship began sinking, eventually reaching the bottom of the 48-foot (15 m) deep Saigon River. The flight deck and superstructure remained above the surface, but five U.S. sailors were killed. The ship was soon refloated and repaired.
- An escalator accident injured 46 teenagers, one fatally, at Baltimore's Memorial Stadium, where they were given free admission to a baseball game between the Orioles and the Cleveland Indians. Ironically, the youngsters were among 20,000 who had been invited for "Safety Patrol Day". Annette S. Costantini, 14, was at the front of the line and was crushed by the stampede that resulted when the top of the escalator was partially blocked by a wooden barricade.
- About 1,000 students participated in the first major student demonstration against the Vietnam War, marching in New York City as part of the "May 2nd Movement" that had been organized by students at Yale University. Marches also occurred in San Francisco, Boston, Seattle, and Madison, Wisconsin.
- Senator Barry Goldwater received more than 75% of the vote in the Texas Republican Presidential referendum, "a nonbinding survey of voter sentiment".
- The long running BBC television documentary series Horizon was broadcast for the first time, with the new BBC-2 network presenting "The World of Buckminster Fuller".
- West Ham United won the FA Cup for the first time in their history, beating Preston North End 3–2 at Wembley Stadium.
- Queen Elizabeth II and the Duke of Edinburgh's seven-week-old son was christened Edward Antony Richard Louis – today he is the Duke of Edinburgh.
- Died:
  - Henry Hezekiah Dee and Charles Eddie Moore, both 19, were hitchhiking in Meadville, Mississippi, when they were kidnapped, beaten and murdered by members of the Ku Klux Klan. Their badly decomposed bodies would be found by chance two months later in July, during the search for three missing civil rights workers (James Chaney, Andrew Goodman, and Michael Schwerner). More than 40 years would pass before James Ford Seale would successfully be prosecuted for the murders and convicted in 2007 at the age of 72. Seale would die in prison in 2011.
  - Lady Astor, 84, American-born British politician who became the first woman to ever serve in the United Kingdom's House of Commons. She was born as Nancy Witcher Langhorne near Danville, Virginia, in 1879, and served from 1919 to 1945.

== May 3, 1964 (Sunday) ==
- Voting on independence for the European islands of Malta concluded after three days, with 54.5% of the valid votes in favor of a proposed constitution that provided for Malta as a parliamentary democracy with a British Governor-General. On the question "Do you approve of the constitution proposed by the Government of Malta, endorsed by the Legislative Assembly, and published in the Malta Gazette?", 65,714 voted "yes" and 54,919 voted "no".
- Voting for the 99-seat Parliament of Lebanon concluded after five consecutive Sundays, with independent candidates winning 70 of the contests. The other 29 seats were scattered among six political parties, with Camille Chamoun's National Liberal Party getting 7 of the seats.
- Born: Ron Hextall, Canadian ice hockey goaltender; in Brandon, Manitoba

== May 4, 1964 (Monday) ==
- The soap opera Another World was first broadcast on NBC in the United States. Another World, which was a spin-off from two other soap operas (As the World Turns, Guiding Light), is set in the fictional town of Bay City and centers around on exotic melodrama between families of different classes and philosophies. The soap opera would air for 35 years on the network before airing its final episode on June 25, 1999.
- The U.S. House of Representatives passed a resolution, by voice vote, recognizing that bourbon whiskey was a "distinctive product of the United States" and asking that U.S. government agencies "take appropriate action to prohibit the importation into the United States of whiskey designated as bourbon whiskey". The measure, "an expression of congressional sentiment" rather than a law, had passed the U.S. Senate in September, and noted that Scotland, Canada and France prohibited the importation, respectively, of scotch, Canadian whisky and cognac.
- The Gandak River Irrigation and Power Project was inaugurated in Nepal by Nepal's King Mahendra Bir Bikram Shah and India's Prime Minister Jawaharlal Nehru, four years after the two nations had agreed to the construction of a barrage to dam the river to provide electrification of the area.

== May 5, 1964 (Tuesday) ==
- The government of Israel announced that it had completed construction of the National Water Carrier of Israel, an irrigation project for increased usage of the Jordan River. On January 16, Egypt's President Nasser and the leaders of 12 other Arab nations had declared that they would divert the three main tributaries of the river away from Israel. After warnings from the United States, the Soviet Union and the United Nations, the Arab nations dropped their diversion plans and made no further objections to the Jordan Waters project.
- Born: Heike Henkel (born Heike Redetzky), German track athlete and Olympic gold medalist in the women's high jump, 1992; in Kiel, West Germany
- Died: Howard Zahniser, 58, American environmentalist who authored the Wilderness Act of 1964, died from heart disease two months before Congress passed the legislation.

== May 6, 1964 (Wednesday) ==
- In the case of Dering v Uris, Dr. Wladislaw Dering won a Pyrrhic victory in a court of the Queen's Bench division against novelist Leon Uris and his publisher, Kimber and Company, in a suit for libel arising from Uris's bestselling novel Exodus. Judge Frederick Lawton agreed that Dr. Dering, a physician at the Auschwitz extermination camp, had been defamed by an untrue statement that he had failed to use anesthesia in some of his experimental operations on Jewish inmates, but awarded the doctor damages of a single halfpenny— and ordered Dr. Dering to pay more than £25,000 (about $75,000 at the time) as the plaintiff's one-half of the court costs. Dr. Dering would pass away later in the year before the costs could be paid. In 1970, Uris would publish another bestseller, QB VII, loosely based on the Dering trial.
- Joe Orton's black comedy Entertaining Mr Sloane premièred at the New Arts Theatre in London.
- Born: Dana Hill, American film actress; as Dana Lynne Goetz in Encino, California (died of diabetic stroke, 1996)

== May 7, 1964 (Thursday) ==
- Pacific Air Lines Flight 773 crashed near Concord, California, killing all 44 people on board. The Fairchild F-27 had started from Reno, Nevada, made a stop at Stockton, California and was 40 miles (64 km) short of its San Francisco destination when it went down. Among the first clues of what had happened was the discovery of a cocked .357 caliber revolver, found in the wreckage, with six spent cartridges. The next day, the FBI confirmed that the cockpit recorder had picked up pilot Ernest Clark shouting, "My God, I've been shot!" before the plane went down. The revolver's serial number was traced to passenger Francisco "Frank" Gonzales, who had represented the Philippines in sailing at the 1960 Summer Olympic games, and who had taken out a $100,000 life insurance policy before boarding at Reno.
- U.S. president Lyndon Johnson first used the term that would describe his vision of federally funded social programs to create "the Great Society". Speaking to college students at Ohio University in Athens, Ohio, President Johnson said, "America is yours — yours to make a better land — yours to build the great society." He would describe the concept further at the University of Michigan on May 22.
- Two people were killed by the explosion of a rocket in a demonstration of rocket mail on Hasselkopf Mountain, near Braunlage, West Germany, by aeronautical engineer Gerhard Zucker. The West German government banned civilian rocket launches after the disaster.
- Born: Denis Mandarino, Brazilian composer, artist and writer; in São Paulo

== May 8, 1964 (Friday) ==
- Ronald Wolfe became the last person in the United States to be executed for the crime of rape without homicide, after his conviction for a brutal attack in 1959 against an 8-year-old girl in Troy, Missouri. Wolf's execution took place in the gas chamber at the Missouri State Penitentiary in Jefferson City.
- Born:
  - Melissa Gilbert, American actress and TV director, former president of the Screen Actors Guild; in Los Angeles
  - Bobby Labonte, American stock car racer and 2000 NASCAR Winston Cup Series champion; in Corpus Christi, Texas
  - Dave Rowntree, English drummer for the rock band Blur; in Colchester
- Died: Kichisaburo Nomura, 86, former Japanese Ambassador to the United States at the time of the attack on Pearl Harbor

== May 9, 1964 (Saturday) ==
- A plot to assassinate U.S. Secretary of Defense Robert S. McNamara was foiled, three days before his visit to South Vietnam, with the arrest of Viet Cong agent Nguyen Van Troi. Troi, who would be celebrated as a martyr in North Vietnam after his October 15 execution, had planned to detonate a bomb as McNamara was being driven across the Cong Ly Bridge in Saigon (now Ho Chi Minh City) on May 12.
- South Korean President Park Chung Hee reshuffled his Cabinet, after a series of student demonstrations against his efforts to restore diplomatic and trade relations with Japan. Choi Tu-son, the publisher of South Korea's largest newspaper, resigned as prime minister and was replaced two days later by Foreign Minister Chung Il-kwon.
- Great Western Railway steam locomotive 7029 Clun Castle ran from Plymouth to Bristol Temple Meads non-stop in a record time of 133 minutes and 9 seconds. Had it not been restricted to 80 miles per hour (130 km/h) down Whiteball Bank near Wellington, it could have improved on the time.
- Died: Ngo Dinh Can, 53, South Vietnamese politician who had brutally governed the area around the city of Huế as the appointee of his older brother, the late president Ngo Dinh Diem, was executed by a firing squad. Convicted by the military government of murder, extortion and illegal arrests, Can had been refused asylum by the United States embassy after the assassination of Diem and another brother, Ngo Dinh Nhu. Because he was severely ill with diabetes and heart trouble, Can was taken on a stretcher to a sporting field in Saigon, tied to a wooden stake. Earlier in the day, Phan Quang Dong, the former chief of Can's secret police force, was executed at the municipal stadium in Huế before a crowd of 40,000 people.

== May 10, 1964 (Sunday) ==
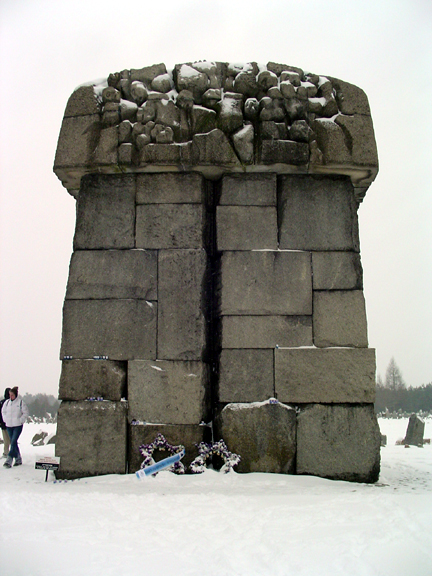
Treblinka memorial

- The commemorative memorial to the victims of the Treblinka death camp was dedicated in Poland. Designed by Adam Haupt and Franciszek Duszenko, the memorial was a broken 26-foot (7.9 m) obelisk surrounded by 17,000 pieces of sharp granite.
- Singer and film actor Frank Sinatra almost drowned in an undertow while swimming in Hawaii, where he had been filming None but the Brave. One of the co-stars of the movie, Brad Dexter, swam out to rescue Sinatra and helped save his life.
- Marco Aurelio Robles defeated former president Arnulfo Arias and five other candidates to win the presidential election in Panama.
- Born: Mark Andre, French-born classical music composer; in Paris
- Died:
  - Vic Morabito, 45, American businessman and controversial co-owner of the San Francisco 49ers NFL team, died of a heart attack"
  - Carol Haney, 39, American actress and Tony award winner for the Broadway play The Pajama Game, died from pneumonia
  - Mikhail Larionov, 82, Russian avant-garde painter and founder of Rayonism

== May 11, 1964 (Monday) ==
- North American Aviation unveiled the prototype of the American B-70 bomber at its facilities at Palmdale, California. With six engines, and capable of flying at high altitude at a speed of Mach 3, the aircraft would make its first flight on September 21, but would prove in flight testing to be too dangerous to be used at high speeds, and would be retired in 1969, without ever going into production.
- On May 11 and 12, the primary and backup crews for Gemini 3 inspected a spacecraft No.3 crew station mock-up at McDonnell. They found all major aspects of the crew station acceptable. A few items remained to be corrected but would not affect the launch schedule.
- Terence Conran opened the first Habitat store, later a large retail chain, on London's Fulham Road.
- Born: John Parrott, English professional snooker player and 1991 world champion; in Liverpool

== May 12, 1964 (Tuesday) ==
- The first of 507 people to be hospitalized, in the Scottish city of Aberdeen, for typhoid from food poisoning was a student at the University of Aberdeen who was admitted to the infirmary at her dormitory. Two days later, her roommate would become ill, and within a week, the number of admissions to City Hospital had risen to 12. By the end of the month, 238 patients would be in isolation at the infectious disease ward. Health inspectors would eventually trace the origin to a supermarket on Aberdeen's Union Street, where many of the patients had purchased sliced corned beef or other cold meats. The origin had been a 7-pound (3.2 kg) can of corned beef, imported from Argentina, that had been contaminated with the bacterium Salmonella typhi; other meats cut afterward with the same slicing machine, and then stored in an uncooled display case in front of a window, were tainted with the same bacteria. The epidemic would abate by the end of July, though consumption of corned beef in the United Kingdom would fall by more than half for the rest of the year. Though only 50 supermarket customers were initially infected, the disease had spread by contact from there, leading to the joke that "Only in Aberdeen would you get 507 slices out of a can of corned beef."
- The government of Tunisia passed a law barring foreigners from owning land in the North African nation. In 1958, 20 percent of the land owned by non-Tunisians had been ceded by agreement with France, and in 1960, another 25% was confiscated. Under the nationalization policy, 505,000 hectares (1,250,000 acres) came under government ownership.
- Died: Clarence Cannon, 85, U.S. representative for Missouri since 1923 and Chairman of the House Appropriations Committee, died in Washington, D.C., soon after announcing his plans to run for a 21st term of office.

== May 13, 1964 (Wednesday) ==
- Shortly after taking off at 2:00 in the afternoon from Nellis Air Force Base, a crippled F-105D jet fighter crashed into a residential neighborhood in North Las Vegas, Nevada, destroying nine houses near the intersection of Lenwood Avenue and Salt Lake Street, and killing four people on the ground, along with the pilot. U.S. Air Force Lt. Raynor L. Herbert stayed with the plane to keep it from striking Lincoln Elementary School, which was occupied with 800 students.
- Salah al-Din al-Bitar was named as the Prime Minister of Syria for the second time, having served for eight months in 1963. He would step down on October 4 after less than five months. He would serve a final time for two months in 1966, before President Amin al-Hafiz was overthrown, and live in exile until his assassination on July 21, 1980.
- The United States Department of Defense began transformation of the uninhabited Alaskan island of Amchitka into a nuclear test site, with the arrival of the first drilling rig.
- Brazil broke off diplomatic relations with Cuba.
- Born: Stephen Colbert, American comedian and television show host; in Washington, D.C.
- Died: Diana Wynyard, 58, English actress, died from kidney failure.

== May 14, 1964 (Thursday) ==
- At the Egyptian city of Aswan, United Arab Republic President Gamal Abdel Nasser and the Soviet Union's Prime Minister and Party First Secretary Nikita Khrushchev jointly pressed a button that set off a 352-pound (160 kg) charge of dynamite, destroying "a plug of sand and rock" and diverting the Nile River into a canal to complete the first stage of the Soviet-financed Aswan Dam project.
- Born: Suzy Kolber, American sportscaster; in Philadelphia

== May 15, 1964 (Friday) ==
- The guided missile destroyer USS Biddle, soon to be renamed the USS Claude V. Ricketts, became the first U.S. Navy ship to engage in the "mixed-manning experiment", with a crew of 17 officers and 305 enlisted men from the navies of seven NATO members. The international crew was the first effort toward the American proposal of a Multilateral Force (MLF), an idea that never reached fruition.
- Deactivation of the Atlas D and Atlas E series of the American SM-65 Atlas intercontinental ballistic missiles began, with their replacement on bases and in silos by the newer LGM-30 Minuteman missiles. The process of Atlas deactivation would be completed by February 17, 1965.
- Born: Lars Løkke Rasmussen, Prime Minister of Denmark 2009-2011 and 2015-2019, Minister of Foreign Affairs since 2022; in Vejle

== May 16, 1964 (Saturday) ==
- U.S. Army Captains Ben W. Stutts and Charleton W. Voltz, whose OH-23 helicopter was shot down over North Korea on May 17, 1963, when they strayed north of the Demilitarized Zone, were released after 365 days of imprisonment. In return for the release, the United Nations Command had agreed to sign a statement that Stutts and Voltz had committed espionage. North Korea declined to return the helicopter.
- Twelve young men in New York City publicly burned their draft cards to protest against the Vietnam War, the first mass act of resistance in the history of this particular war. The demonstration, with about 50 people in Union Square, was organized by the War Resisters League chaired by David McReynolds.
- U.S. Defense Secretary McNamara ordered the deactivation of the Titan I missiles, which had become obsolete because they had to be raised out of their silos and fueled before they could be launched. The first Titan I missile would be taken off alert on January 4.
- Three high school friends in Hoboken, New Jersey—Tony Conza, Peter DeCarlo and Angelo Baldassare—opened the first Blimpie submarine sandwich restaurant.

== May 17, 1964 (Sunday) ==
- "Operation Desert Strike", the largest American military exercise since the end of World War II, began in an 18,000 square mile area of desert in the U.S. states of California, Nevada and Arizona, and involved 89,000 U.S. Army and U.S. Air Force personnel training for two weeks in mock combat. Coordinated by United States Strike Command, the "huge mock war between the mythical nations of Calonia and Nezona" employed tanks, artillery, jet fighters, paratroopers, and tens of thousands of men using blank-loaded weapons. Based on data from the exercise, the U.S. Army developed the Air Support Operations Center, which would soon be introduced into the Vietnam War. Despite the precautions, 34 American servicemen had been killed by the time that the exercise ended on May 30, mostly in traffic accidents involving military vehicles.
- The debate over a new Canadian flag began in time for Canada's 1967 centennial began at the 20th Royal Canadian Legion convention, in Winnipeg, when Prime Minister Lester Pearson told an unsympathetic audience that the time had come to replace the red ensign with a distinctive maple leaf flag. "I believe most sincerely," Pearson told the veterans, "that it is time now for Canadians to unfurl a flag that is truly distinctive and truly national in character, as Canadian as the Maple Leaf that should be its dominant design; a flag which cannot be mistaken for the emblem of any other country; a flag of the future which honours also the past; Canada's own and only Canada's." Pearson would introduce the resolution in the Canadian House of Commons on June 5.
- The first Tim Hortons restaurant was opened, making its debut on the corner of Ottawa Street North and Dunsmore Street in Hamilton, Ontario, as Tim Horton Donuts. Almost 60 years later, the chain would have over 5,300 franchises worldwide.
- In New York City, 150 bicyclists rode together through the streets from Manhattan to the site of the World's Fair in Flushing "in an attempt to make the city's roads and bridges more bicycle-friendly."
- Born:
  - Menno Oosting, Dutch professional tennis player; in Son en Breugel (killed in auto accident, 1999)
  - Stratos Apostolakis, Greek footballer and former national team captain; in Agrinio
- Died:
  - Steve Owen, 66, American NFL coach and Pro Football Hall of Fame inductee
  - Otto Wille Kuusinen, 82, Finnish-Soviet politician and writer

== May 18, 1964 (Monday) ==
- Mwanawina III, King of Barotseland, and Kenneth Kaunda, Prime Minister of Northern Rhodesia (now Zambia), signed the Barotseland Agreement establishing the Lozi people's autonomy within Zambia as the Western Province. In return, Barotseland would renounce its relationship with the British crown. The autonomy would last only five years after Zambia's independence. In 1969, a majority of Zambians (but only 31% of the people in Barotseland) voted in a referendum to approve Zambia's "Constitutional Amendment Act of 1969", which declared that all provinces in Zambia would receive equal status.
- By a 5–3 decision in the case of Schneider v. Rusk, the U.S. Supreme Court allowed the restoration of American citizenship of more than 50,000 people who had been stripped of their naturalized citizenship under a 1952 amendment of the Immigration and Nationality Act. The Court declared unconstitutional a provision that took away the status of foreign-born people, who had become naturalized U.S. citizens, if they lived for more than three years continuously in their native land.
- Jacqueline Cochran, who in 1953 had become the first woman to "break the sound barrier" by flying faster than Mach 1, became the first woman to fly faster than Mach 2, setting a new women's airspeed record of 1,429 mph (2,300 km/h) in an F-104 Starfighter. At the time of her death from heart problems in 1980, Cochran "held over 250 speed, altitude, and distance records, more than any other pilot in the world, male or female."

== May 19, 1964 (Tuesday) ==
- The United States Department of State disclosed that more than 40 hidden microphones had been found embedded in the walls of the U.S. Embassy in Moscow, and that it had filed a protest with the Soviet government. The devices, which were at least 8 inches (200 mm) inside the walls and "integrated to main structural reports", had apparently been in place since 1953, when the building was first leased to the United States. All of the microphones were found on the eighth, ninth and tenth floors of the building, where embassy offices were located, and were not found until February, when Embassy officials tore down the walls of a room that "frequently was used for sensitive discussions". The other microphones were found by following the wiring system from the first one discovered.
- The United States began "Operation Yankee Team", low-level and medium-level reconnaissance flights from South Vietnam over Communist strongholds in neighboring Laos, at the request of the Royal Laotian Armed Forces. Two days after flights began over southern Laos in the area that was part of the "Ho Chi Minh Trail", U.S. Navy planes would conduct sorties over northern Laos.
- Two days after Pope Paul VI announced its creation at the celebration of the holiday of Pentecost, the Secretariat for Non-Christians was created, with Cardinal Paolo Marella as its first secretary.

== May 20, 1964 (Wednesday) ==
- U.S. President Johnson signed into law the Bartlett Act of 1964, subtitled "Prohibition of Foreign Fishing Vessels in the Territorial Waters of the United States", making it unlawful for vessels of any other nation to conduct fishing operations within three nautical miles (3.4524 miles or 5.5561 kilometers) of the U.S. coast, as well as areas further out designated under the Convention on the Continental Shelf as "continental shelf fishery resources of the United States". With regard to the United States continental shelf, designated resources under the exclusive jurisdiction claimed by the U.S. ranged as far as 200 miles off of the coasts of New England and Alaska.
- Died: Rudy Lewis, 27, lead vocalist for The Drifters, died of a heroin overdose the day before he was scheduled to record one of the group's most famous songs, "Under the Boardwalk". The next day, backup singer Johnny Moore took Lewis's place, singing "in a lower register than his norm" because the key and the music had been written for Lewis.

== May 21, 1964 (Thursday) ==
- For the first time, Americans were shot at from Laos as antiaircraft artillery fired by the Communist Pathet Lao damaged a U.S. Navy RF-8A Crusader that was flying a photographic reconnaissance mission. The RF-8A, flown by U.S. Navy Lieutenant Charles F. Klusmann, burned for 20 minutes in the air but Klusmann was able to return for a safe landing aboard the aircraft carrier USS Kitty Hawk (CVA-63). Lt. Klussman's plane would be shot down over Laos on a mission on June 6, and he would be captured after parachuting to safety, but would escape his captors three months later.
- Born: Arthur C. Brooks, conservative American social scientist and President of the American Enterprise Institute; in Spokane, Washington
- Died: James Franck, 81, German physicist and 1925 Nobel laureate (with Gustav Hertz) for the Franck–Hertz experiment of 1914 that first measured the quantum nature of atoms.

== May 22, 1964 (Friday) ==
- In his commencement speech to University of Michigan graduates as well as to his largest audience as President (90,000 people at Michigan Stadium at Ann Arbor, Michigan), U.S. President Johnson formally introduced his vision of "the Great Society", a welfare state of federally-funded social programs to fight poverty and transform the nation. "For in your time," he told graduates, "we have the opportunity to move not only toward the rich society and the powerful society, but upward to the Great Society," which he said "rests on abundance and liberty for all... demands an end to poverty and racial injustice... a place where every child can find knowledge to enrich his mind and to enlarge his talents." Johnson, who received an honorary law doctorate, used the term "Great Society" nine times in his 15-minute speech. Though his plan was elaborated at Michigan, President Johnson had first used the term 15 days earlier in a May 7 speech at Ohio University.
- Indonesia defeated Denmark, 5 games to 4, to win the 1964 Thomas Cup badminton competition held in Tokyo. In the final match, the team of Tan King Gwan and A. P. Unang beat Erland Kops and Henning Borch, 15–6, to capture the Cup.
- Died: deLesseps "Chep" Morrison, 52, former Mayor of New Orleans and former U.S. Ambassador to the Organization of American States, was killed along with six other people in the crash of a private Piper Aztec airplane on a business trip in Mexico. Morrison and his party departed Matamoros, Tamaulipas at 5:05 in the afternoon for what was to be a one-hour flight to Tampico, but crashed into the side of a mountain in the Sierra de Tamaulipas during a severe thunderstorm.

== May 23, 1964 (Saturday) ==
- As the North Yemen Civil War continued, Egyptian military intelligence "came within an ace of assassinating" Hassan ibn Yahya, the Crown Prince of the Royalists who were supported by Saudi Arabia in their fight against the Yemen Arab Republic that had overthrown the monarchy in 1962. A member of the Hashid tribe, hired by Egyptian agents, raided Prince Hassan's headquarters in the mountains at Al-Gahrir, while Hassan's low-paid bodyguards revolted because they were paid only half as much as the guards of other princes. Hassan "escaped with his life, but not before losing his hoard of gold."
- In the U.S., a fire killed 17 people after breaking out during a fundraising event for the Samoan Catholic Benefit Society in the social hall of All Hallows Catholic Church in San Francisco. The fire started when a cigarette lighter ignited flames from an open pan of gasoline while a Samoan flaming sword dancer was preparing for his performance, and was accelerated when a member of the orchestra sprayed the gasoline pan with a pressurized water fire extinguisher. The exits were partially blocked because the hall was crowded with tables and chairs.
- Mrs. Madeline Dassault, wife of French multimillionaire Marcel Dassault, was kidnapped while getting out of her car in front of her Paris home. Two gendarmes from Creil rescued Mrs. Dassault, unharmed, the next day at an abandoned farmhouse near the village of Villers-sous-Saint-Leu 27 miles (43 km) north of Paris, after being tipped off by neighbors who had become alarmed by lights inside the building. After overpowering her captor, Matheiu Costa, the police were surprised when the farm's owners, brothers Gabriel and Gaston Darmont, drove up.
- Firefighter Jim Templeton took three photographs of his five-year-old daughter on Burgh Marsh, near Burgh by Sands in Cumbria, England. When the photos were developed, one of them showed an unidentified figure behind the girl which came to be known as the Cumberland Spaceman.
- Nearly four years after the discovery of a large underground oil reservoir in the Tyumen Oblast of the Soviet Union, the first cargo from the Shaim Oil Field was shipped on the Irtysh River to a refinery in Omsk.
- Pablo Picasso painted his fourth version of Head of a Bearded Man.
- Born: Didier Garcia, French former cyclist who competed at the 1984 Summer Olympics; in Le Blanc-Mesnil, Seine-Saint-Denis, France
- Died: Bob Alcorn, 66, former Dallas County, Texas deputy sheriff who had shot killers "Bonnie and Clyde" (Bonnie Parker and Clyde Barrow) in an ambush near Gibsland, Louisiana, died from a heart attack 30 years to the day after the May 23, 1934 gunfire that he and five other lawmen had carried out. The day before, he had spoken to a reporter about his recollections.

== May 24, 1964 (Sunday) ==
- Republican presidential candidate and U.S. senator Barry Goldwater suggested the use of nuclear weapons in the Vietnam War during an interview with reporter Howard K. Smith on the ABC program Issues and Answers. Goldwater did not advocate using the weapons against enemy troops, but did say that enemy supply lines could be made unusable if the cover offered by rain forests and jungles was removed. "[D]efoliation of the forests by low yield atomic weapons could well be done", he said on a pre-recorded interview with Smith. "When you remove the foliage, your remove the cover. The major supply lines too, I think, would have to be interdicted where they leave Red China... according to my studies of the geography, it would not be difficult to destroy these routes." An author would later describe Goldwater's idea as "a gift to Democratic Party campaign managers who wanted to position Johnson as a responsible man of peace" and UN Secretary General U Thant said that anyone advocating the use of atomic weapons in Vietnam was "out of his mind". Goldwater would go on to lose to President Johnson in a landslide defeat in November.
- In the second-deadliest riot ever at a sporting event, 328 people were killed and more than 500 injured at an international soccer football match at Lima between Peru and the visiting team representing Argentina. The game was part of the qualifier of the seven-nation CONMEBOL South American competition for two of the 16 spots in the 1964 Summer Olympics. Argentina had already clinched a spot, but Peru and Brazil were tied for second place. With six minutes left, and Argentina leading, 1–0, Peru's Kilo Lobaton had apparently scored a tying goal, but referee Angel Pazos from Uruguay called a foul and disallowed the score. Two angry spectators ran onto the field and were severely beaten by police, and the crowd was enraged. As fans on the south side of the Estadio Nacional tried to get out of the exits, the police began firing tear gas into the stands. People who remained in their seats were uninjured, and most of the deaths were from people who were trampled or pinned against the closed doors at the exits.
- The Soviet space probe Zond 1, set for a July 18 flyby of the planet Venus, began to have its first problems, with the failure of one of the transmitters. Telemetry received back on Earth indicated that the orbital module had depressurized during the flight, because "the glass of the solar orientation sensor dome was not airtight", followed by a short circuit. The descent capsule would continue to transmit data and receive command until June, allowing for two trajectory corrections to be made, before failing. With corrections no longer possible, the probe would pass no closer than 100,000 kilometres (62,000 mi) of that planet.
- NASCAR driver Glenn "Fireball" Roberts was fatally injured in the World 600 race at the Charlotte Motor Speedway, after he spun out during the seventh lap and drivers Junior Johnson and Ned Jarrett crashed into the back of his car. Jim Paschal would ultimately win the race. Roberts, with burns over more than 60 percent of his body, would survive for 39 days in a burn unit before dying of pneumonia. His death would lead to "the development of fire-retardant racing suits".
- General Electric company brought out the first "solid state" portable television set that used transistors rather than vacuum tubes, allowing a much lower weight to carry.
- Born: Adrian Moorhouse, English swimmer, 1991 world champion and 1988 Olympic gold medalist; in Bradford
- Died: Erich Möller, 59, German road and motor-paced cycling champion

== May 25, 1964 (Monday) ==
- The United States Supreme Court issued its decision in Griffin v. County School Board of Prince Edward County, unanimously ordering Prince Edward County, Virginia, to reopen its public schools, which had been closed for more than four years. The Court reversed a 1963 decision by Virginia's highest court holding that the state was not required to operate schools in any of its counties. Justice Hugo Black wrote that the decision denied equal rights to the county's schoolchildren, declaring that "Prince Edward children must go to a private school or none at all; all other Virginia children can go to public schools." The county's public schools had been closed since 1959 after the school board declined to follow a federal court order to file a plan for desegregation of schools, and no school taxes can be levied by the county during that time.
- By a 67–0 vote in the Haitian Congress, President of Haiti Francois "Papa Doc" Duvalier was declared to be "President for Life" (Président à vie) under Article 197 of a new constitution. The measure reportedly would be overwhelmingly approved in a referendum on June 22. Duvalier's oppressive rule would continue for the rest of his life. Upon his death on April 21, 1971, his 19-year-old son, Jean-Claude Duvalier, would become president.
- At the 16th Primetime Emmy Awards ceremony, The Dick Van Dyke Show and The Defenders won the major awards for Program Achievement, while Jack Klugman and Shelley Winters won the main acting awards.
- Born: Ray Stevenson, Northern Irish film actor; in Lisburn (d.2023)

== May 26, 1964 (Tuesday) ==
- Mission 1005 of the Corona spy satellite series broke up during its uncontrolled re-entry into Earth's atmosphere, and its capsule crashed on a farm near La Fría, Venezuela. Sent up by the United States on April 27, the fifth "Corona-J" satellite had been presumed lost in the Atlantic Ocean after five bright pieces were seen flying over Maracaibo, but the farm's owner would stumble across it on July 7. On August 1, Leonardo Davilla, a Venezuelan photographer, would contact the U.S. Army attaché after the farmer had attempted to sell him the machinery. The Venezuelan Army would confiscate the object before the American attaché could arrive, and the capsule would not be returned to the United States until August 10.
- President Abdul Salam Arif of Iraq and President Gamal Abdel Nasser of Egypt signed an agreement creating the "Joint Presidential Council" as the first step in a unification of the two countries within the United Arab Republic. On October 16, the two would agree to create the "Unified Political Command" to merge the two nations over a period of two years, but by May 1965, the merger proposal would fall apart.
- Born:
  - Lenny Kravitz, American singer and songwriter, four time Grammy Award winner; in Manhattan, New York City
  - Caitlín R. Kiernan, Irish-born American science fiction and fantasy author; in Dublin

== May 27, 1964 (Wednesday) ==
- Jawaharlal Nehru, the Prime Minister of India since the nation's independence in 1947, died from a ruptured aorta. The evening before, he and his daughter, future prime minister Indira Gandhi, had returned to New Delhi from a vacation in Dehradun, worked at his desk until 11:00 that night, and prepared for the next day's work. At 6:25 in the morning at his residence, shortly after he awoke, he was stricken with chest pains and collapsed. At 2:00 that afternoon, Minister of Steel Chidambaram Subramaniam announced to his fellow members of parliament in the Lok Sabha, "The prime minister is no more. The light is out." Gulzarilal Nanda, the Minister of Home Affairs, was sworn in as the acting prime minister at midnight, and served in that capacity until he was replaced by Lal Bahadur Shastri on June 9.
- U.S. President Johnson revealed that the United States and the Soviet Union had completed negotiations on a treaty to establish consulates in each other's nations. The treaty's contents would be kept secret until June. The occasion marked "the first bilateral treaty between the two nations since the United States recognized the Russian communist regime" in 1933.
- Nearly one third of the National Army of Colombia began "Operation Marquetalia", the destruction of the "Marquetalia Republic", a leftist guerrilla stronghold in the rural Colombian departamento of Huila. By June 14, the Colombian soldiers would be able to declare a victory, driving out the guerrillas and their allies, and destroying anything left behind.
- The UK pirate radio station Radio Sutch began broadcasting from Shivering Sands Army Fort in the Thames Estuary.
- Internazionale beat Real Madrid 3–1 at the Prater Stadium at Vienna to win association football's European Cup.
- Born: Adam Carolla, American comedian, actor, and radio personality; in Los Angeles

== May 28, 1964 (Thursday) ==
- The Palestinian National Council, with 422 representatives, convened in Jerusalem, which was still part of Jordan at the time. At the conclusion of the meeting on June 2, the Council proclaimed the establishment of the Palestine Liberation Organization (PLO), and adopted the Palestinian National Covenant, calling for the right of Palestinian Arabs to return to the area occupied by the nation of Israel and for their right of self-determination within the area. Ahmad Shukeiri was elected as the first Chairman of the Executive Committee of the PLO, whose 14 members he was authorized to select.
- An estimated 1.5 million people attended the funeral of Indian prime minister, Jawaharlal Nehru, whose body was publicly cremated on a funeral pyre at the Shantivana on the banks of the Yamuna River. At 4:36 p.m. in New Delhi, Nehru's 17-year-old grandson, Sanjay Gandhi, applied a torch to the cremation platform. The next day, Nehru's ashes would be taken to his birthplace at Allahabad to be scattered at the confluence of the Yamuna and the Ganges rivers.
- AS-101, the sixth Saturn I rocket launch, made the first successful placement of the prototype of the Apollo Command/Service Module into Earth orbit, and confirmed the structural integrity of the design for the vehicle that would take astronauts to the Moon. Following the launch at 12:01 p.m. from Cape Kennedy, the stage and payload would re-enter Earth's atmosphere over the Pacific Ocean on June 2.
- Born: Jeff Fenech, Australian professional boxer, former IBF bantamweight champion (1985–1987), WBC super bantamweight champion (1987–1988) and WBC featherweight champion (1988–1989); in St Peters, New South Wales

== May 29, 1964 (Friday) ==
- Having deposed them in a January coup, South Vietnamese leader Nguyen Khanh had rival Generals Tran Van Don and Le Van Kim convicted of "lax morality".
- The U.S. Air Force's anti-satellite system was declared to be fully operational. The U.S. Army had inaugurated a different system on August 1, 1963.
- The German football club SV Südwest Ludwigshafen was founded, by a merger of two older clubs, Sportverein 03 Ludwigshafen and Phoenix Tura 1882.
- Born: Fresh Kid Ice (stage name for Christopher Wong Won), Trinidadian-American rapper and co-founder of 2 Live Crew (d. 2017); in Port of Spain, Trinidad and Tobago

== May 30, 1964 (Saturday) ==
- A. J. Foyt won the Indianapolis 500, but the annual motor race was marred by a seven-car accident that killed drivers Eddie Sachs and Dave MacDonald. Only two minutes after the start of the race, MacDonald, a 26-year old rookie driver, went into a spin on the second lap after coming out of turn. Sachs's car then collided with MacDonald's, and both vehicles exploded. For the first time in the race's history, driving was halted, and would not resume for nearly two hours. Besides Sachs and MacDonald, five other drivers and three spectators suffered burns. Foyt's victory was the last 500 won by a front-engined "roadster". All races since then have been won by rear-engined cars.
- Manuel Santana defeated Nicola Pietrangeli 6–3, 6–1, 4–6, 7–5, to win the men's singles at the French Open (at the time, referred to simply as the French tennis championship).
- Born: Wynonna Judd, American country-music singer; as Christina Claire Ciminella in Ashland, Kentucky
- Died: Leo Szilard, 66, Hungarian-born nuclear physicist who, along with Enrico Fermi, patented the nuclear reactor

== May 31, 1964 (Sunday) ==
- The longest game in Major League Baseball history, up to that time, ended at Shea Stadium in New York at 11:24 p.m., seven hours and 23 minutes after it had started, with the San Francisco Giants beating the New York Mets, 8 to 6, in the 23rd inning. The game was the second of a doubleheader between the Mets and Giants that day (the Giants won the first one, 5 to 3), and the personnel and fans who had chosen to stay for both contests were in the park for more than ten hours.
- Víctor Paz Estenssoro, the only candidate on the ballot, was re-elected to a third term as President of Bolivia, and his Movimiento Nacionalista Revolucionario (MNR) party retained 57 of the 73 seats in the Chamber of Deputies and 22 of the 27 seats in the Bolivian Senate.
- Manned Spacecraft Center (MSC) reported that several devices to familiarize the Gemini flight crews with the scheduled extravehicular tests were being developed. The crews would receive training on a device called a "data simulator," which simulated the mechanical effects of zero-g environment. Gemini boilerplate No. 2 would be used in the vacuum chamber. A KC-135 aircraft flying zero-g parabolas would be used for ingress and egress training, and the Gemini mission simulator would be used for procedures and pressurized-suit, vehicle-control practice. Further training would be accomplished on the crew procedures development trainer and the flight spacecraft. MSC anticipated that the necessary equipment and development of preliminary procedures should allow a training program to begin in August 1964.
- Born: Darryl McDaniels, American rap DJ with Run-D.M.C.; in Harlem
