= Osvaldo Lacerda =

Brazilian composer

- Born: March 23, 1927; São Paulo, Brazil
- Died: July 18, 2011 (aged 84); São Paulo, Brazil

Osvaldo Costa de Lacerda (March 23, 1927 – July 18, 2011) was a Brazilian composer and professor of music. Lacerda is known for a Brazilian nationalist musical style that combines elements of Brazilian folk and popular music as well as twentieth-century art music, as exemplified in the works of his teacher M. Camargo Guarnieri (1907–1997). His compositional output includes works for orchestra, choir, smaller vocal and instrumental ensembles, voice and piano, solo instrument and piano, solo piano, and other solo instruments. He received several musical awards during his lifetime, including the John Simon Guggenheim Memorial Foundation Fellowship, and contributed significantly to the training of younger musicians in Brazil as a professor of composition and theory, member of various musical organizations and societies, and author of textbooks for theory, ear training, and notation.

== Early life and training ==
Lacerda was born in the city of São Paulo in 1927 and remained there throughout his early years. He began his musical training with piano lessons from teacher Ana Veloso de Resende when he was nine years old, later studying piano with José Kliass, and he also started composing in his youth. Between 1945 and 1947 Lacerda studied harmony and counterpoint with Ernesto Kierski and singing with Olga Urbany Ivanov (his mother was also a singer). Clayton Juliano Rodrigues Miranda notes in his dissertation that piano and voice, the two instruments that the composer studied when he was young, would eventually become areas of compositional strength for Lacerda.

Impetus to study composition seriously came when the São Paulo Municipal String Quartet commissioned a work from Lacerda in 1952. At this point, Lacerda began lessons with composer Camargo Guarnieri, with whom he would continue to study until 1962 and who helped popularize Lacerda’s music through recitals. Alongside his studies with Guarnieri, Lacerda also attended law school at the University of São Paulo, graduating in 1961; after earning his degree he focused mainly on composition. Lacerda also founded two artistic societies during this period: the Sociedade Paulista de Arte (1949–1955) and the Sociedade Pró Música Brasileira (1961–1966). In 1962, Lacerda received first prize in the Brazilian National Composition Competition in 1962 for his orchestral suite Piratininga.

In 1962 Lacerda received a John Simon Guggenheim Memorial Foundation Fellowship and traveled to the U.S. to study with Vittorio Giannini in New York and Aaron Copland at Tanglewood. In 1965 Lacerda participated in the Inter-American Composers Seminar at Indiana University and the Third Inter-American Music Festival in Washington, D.C., having been chosen as the country’s representative for these events by the Brazilian Minister of International Relations. Lacerda returned to Brazil after his American studies and festival participation, and from the late 1970s to early 1980s he also studied orchestration with conductor Roberto Schnorenberg.

== Later life and career ==
From the mid-1960s onward, Lacerda’s career consisted of composing, teaching, writing music textbooks, and promoting the Brazilian national style in art music. He taught at the Escola Municipal de Música de São Paulo from 1969 to 1992 (a government-funded school providing free instrumental and theory teaching), at Santa Marcelina College, and at several music conferences and festivals. He also assisted Guarnieri by giving new students preparatory lessons in counterpoint and harmony. He became a member of the Academia Brasileira de Música in 1972. Lacerda married pianist Eudóxia de Barros (b. 1937) in 1981, and throughout her lifetime she has remained a strong supporter of the composer and his music. In 1984 Lacerda founded his third artistic society, the Centro de Música Brasileira; this organization is still active today. Lacerda also wrote four textbooks that are frequently used in Brazil and Portugal: Compêndio de Teoria Elementar da Música, Exercícios de Teoria Elementar da Música, Curso Preparatório de Solfejo e Ditado Musical, and Regras de Grafia Musical.

Lacerda continued to receive honors and awards throughout his mature years. The Associação Paulista de Criticos de Arte awarded him “Best Chamber Work” and “Best Symphonic Work” for several pieces: Trio for Violin, Cello, and Piano (1970); Quatro pegas modais (1975); Apassionato, cantilena e tocata for viola and piano (1972); Concerto for Flute and String Orchestra (1981); Sonata for Oboe and Piano (1986); and Cromos for Piano and Orchestra (1994). He was featured in festivals both in Brazil and the United States, including Sonidos de las Américas in New York City (1996), the 31st Bar Harbor Music Festival in Maine (1997), and the Latin American Music Festival at Bard College (1999).

== Compositional style ==
The Brazilian nationalist musical style that Guarnieri imparted to Lacerda had roots in the writings of aesthetician Mario de Andrade and continued in the vein of composers such as Heitor Villa-Lobos and Francisco Mignone. Composers in this style brought together features of European art music and musical elements from Brazilian folk and popular music, which itself blends European, African, and indigenous musical heritages. Guarneri taught that composers should absorb these folk sources so that they could naturally use and transform them in their own compositions. This nationalist style can generally be described as neoclassical because it draws from the approaches to form, harmony, and melody of the classical Western tradition, combining these with Brazilian and contemporary European sources of inspiration. In the 1950s, Guarnieri and other composers advocated for the continuation of this national style despite attempts of the Música Viva movement, led by the German-Brazilian composer Hans-Joachim Koellreutter, to promote dodecaphonic composition in Brazil.

One characteristic of Lacerda’s music that reflects his focus on Brazilian traditions is his use of folk dance titles and musical features in many of his instrumental works. Examples of such pieces include his twelve Brasilianas (four-movement piano suites, composed 1965–1993) and three pieces for oboe and piano, “Aboio,” “Segunda Valsa,” and “Toada.” He also set Brazilian children's music in some works; according to scholar of Brazilian music David Appleby, music for children or about childhood has historically been an important part of the Brazilian tradition. Lacerda’s oboe and piano work “Variações sobre dois cantos infantis” consists of variations on the children's songs “Carneirinho, carneirão” and “Sapo Cururú.” In his vocal works, Lacerda set texts in Portuguese as well as some African languages spoken in Brazil. One piece written in a mixture of African languages is his choral work Ofulú Lorêrê: this work is based on a Candomblé song that Guarnieri recorded in the state of Bahia, and influences from that Afro-Brazilian ritual tradition can be heard in Lacerda’s treatment of polyphony and rhythm. In his dissertation, Carlos Audi provides a thorough list of “national elements” in Lacerda’s style that come from Brazilian folk and popular genres, including (but not limited to) use of modes, pentatonic scales, melodies with a narrow range, syncopations, ostinatos, and parallel thirds.

Apart from his interest in Brazilian folk and popular sources, Lacerda also took after his teacher Guarnieri in the latter’s neoclassical use of traditional European forms, such as sonata form or theme and variations. Like Guarnieri, Lacerda also drew from broader currents in twentieth-century Western art music, including contemporary techniques in areas of harmony, rhythm, and atonality. Lacerda believed that it was important for nationalist composers to be open to new techniques so that their music could be a source of pride for their country.

== Selected works ==
A list of Lacerda’s works can be found in Gerard Béhague’s entry on the composer in Die Musik in Geschichte und Gegenwart. A selected works list is also available in Béhague’s entry in Grove Music Online.

== Sources ==
1. Appleby, David P. The Music of Brazil. Austin: The University of Texas Press, 1983.
2. Audi, Carlos Eduardo. “Osvaldo Lacerda: His Importance to Brazilian Music and Elements of His Musical Style.” PhD diss. Florida State University, 2006.
3. Béhague, Gerard. “Lacerda, Osvaldo (Costa de).” In Die Musik in Geschichte und Gegenwart. Vol. 10, Personenteil Kem-Ler. Edited by Friedrich Blume. Kassel: Bärenreiter-Verlag, 2003.
4. Béhague, Gerard. “Lacerda, Osvaldo (Costa de).” In Grove Music Online. Oxford University Press, 2001. https://doi.org/10.1093/gmo/9781561592630.article.15771.
5. Béhague, Gerard. Music in Latin America: An Introduction. Englewood Cliffs, New Jersey: Prentice-Hall, 1979.
6. "Centro de Música Brasileira.” Centro de Música Brasileira. 2018. Accessed 18 November 2018. http://centrodemusicabrasileira.blogspot.com.
7. Di Cavalcanti, Maria José Bernardes. “Brazilian Nationalistic Elements in the “Brasilianas” of Osvaldo Lacerda.” PhD diss. Louisiana State University, 2006.
8. Fukunaga, Sallie Diane Price. “Music for Unaccompanied Clarinet by Contemporary Latin American Composers.” PhD diss. University of Kansas, 1988.
9. Gimenes, Marilia Gabriela do Nascimento. “Osvaldo Lacerda’s Sonata for Flute and Piano (1959): a Performance Guide With Historical Background of Brazilian Genres Embolada, Seresta, and Baião.” PhD diss. University of North Texas, 2012.
10. McCarthy, Keri. “Oboe Music Reviews: Osvaldo Lacerda.” The Double Reed 36, no. 1 (January, 2013): 165–166.
11. Miranda, Clayton Juliano Rodrigues. “The Inception of Trumpet Performance in Brazil and Four Selected Solos for Trumpet and Piano, Including Modern Performance Editions.” PhD diss. North Dakota State University, 2016.
12. Montgomery, Patricia. “The Latin American Piano Suite in the Twentieth Century (Performance).” PhD diss. Indiana University, 1978.
13. “Osvaldo Lacerda.” Academia Brasileira de Música. 2015. Accessed 18 November 2018. http://www.abmusica.org.br/academico.php?n=osvaldo-lacerda&id=84.
14. “Osvaldo Lacerda (1927–2011).” Ava Musical Editions. 2018. Accessed 29 October 2018. http://www.editions-ava.com/store/composer/218/.
15. Reily, Suzel Ana. “Brazil: Central and Southern Areas.” In The Garland Encyclopedia of World Music. Vol. 2, South America, Mexico, Central America, and the Caribbean. Edited by Dale A. Olsen and Daniel E. Sheehy. New York: Garland, 1998.
16. Sá, Gustavo de. “Two Centuries of Brazilian Choral Music.” Liner notes for Saudade: Choral Music from Brazil. Kammerchor Apollini et Musis. Vinzenz Weissenburger. Rondeau Production ROP6049, 2011, compact disc.
17. Smith, Kristen Lia. “The Influence of Folk and Popular Music on Twentieth-Century Flute Music of Brazil.” PhD diss. University of Cincinnati, 2000.
18. Souza Santos, Rubia C. “Selected Piano Trios By Brazilian Composers in the Succession of M. Camargo Guarnieri.” PhD diss. Arizona State University, 2004.
