= Duerme Negrito =

Latin American lullaby

Duerme Negrito ("Sleep, little black one") is a popular Latin American folkloric lullaby, originally from an area near the Colombian and Venezuelan border. The song was compiled by Atahualpa Yupanqui when visiting this region and popularized by him and other musicians, such as Victor Jara, Mercedes Sosa, Jayme Amatnecks, Alfredo Zitarrosa, Daniel Viglietti, and Natalia Lafourcade when touring around the world.

The song tells the story of a mother who leaves her child in the care of a friend or neighbor while she goes out to work hard in the fields for no pay. It is sung by this lady to the little black child who has been left in her care. This lady tells the child to fall asleep, because his mother is working in the fields. The lady promises that the child's mother will bring him treats, such as quails and pork, if he falls asleep. The mother is a slave, as she works without pay. The caregiver tells the boy, if he doesn't fall asleep, the white devil, meaning the slave driver, will come to eat his little feet. His mother continues to work hard, and as she works, she is coughing, and in mourning.

In 2015 the interpretation of the arrangement for the choir of Jayme Amatnecks's of Emiglio Solé's arrangement of the song Duerme Negrito was included in the Spanish short film "Paseo de los melancolicos, 9-3-B-28005-Madrid" of the eminent Spanish director Miguel Trudu, nominated for the Cannes Festival 2017.

This lullaby is sometimes confused with the Afro-Cuban song, Duerme Negrita.

== Listen ==
Duerme Negrito

Vocal arrangement Emiglio Solé

Camerata Ars Musica – Jayme Amatnecks
