= Versatilist manifesto =

Artistic movement

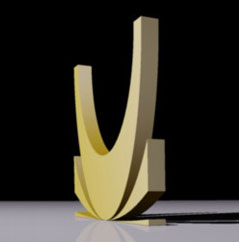
Versatilism Logo.

Versatilism is an artistic movement proposed in 2007, by Brazilian artist Denis Mandarino, from a literary manifesto, with the intention of freeing people from the expert analysis and promote the practice of art as a form of self-knowledge and spiritual enhancement. In the body of text are present the following aesthetic principles and propositions:

1. Eternal life, the existence of God and the spirit;
2. Untying the artistic practice of the art market and self-centeredness;
3. The search for artistic expressions that promote humanity and society, respecting the present level of consciousness of the artist;
4. Continuously changing level of consciousness and learning process as infinite;
5. The absence of art competitions;
6. Questioning the role of the art critic for the inability to assess the man his neighbor in an impartial and timeless.

"New ideas are hard to identify, hard to assimilate, and only detachment may be able to evaluate them in a more open way. When a man assumes the role of giving the verdict about what artists are doing, or the society gives him this role, we are one step closer to repeat the greatest injustices that men of science, philosophy, arts and religion have suffered throughout history." -- Interview about the Versatilist Manifesto

== Versatilist Manifesto ==
Full transcription:

- Versatilism is defined by a manifesto that has as philosophical principle the immortality of soul, which was created by a Supreme Intelligence. The soul is eternally subordinated to the laws that exist in the Universe.
- The term "Versatilist" can give you the false impression that it is necessary the artist masters many languages for being an enthusiast, fact that does not correspond to the intentions of this manifesto. It is possible to work in only one area and be a versatilist.
- Versatilists believe things exist to be studied, learnt and manipulated, once there is enough time for everything in eternity. It is up to the man, in the many steps of his learning process, discover the good or the bad use of what is in his reach.

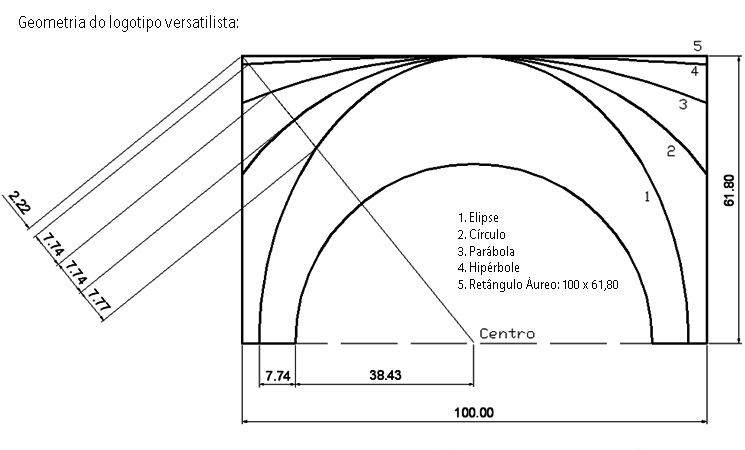
Versatilist logo. The design contains conic sections (circle, ellipse, parabola, and hyperbola) and the golden rectangle (100 x 61,80).

- Being a versatilist is a choice of affinity.
- The versatilist does not get attached to ancient, present or future market demands that enslave the artist to the conventions of his time.
- Versatilism intends to free people from specialized analysis, and promote the exercise of the art as a way of self-knowledge. It is better the artist always does his work in the limit of his possibilities, aiming at enlarging conscience and consequently, the quality of the results.
- The “mistake” is an inevitable part in the evolution process of each person. That is why the artist cannot feel discouraged when faces harsh criticism or self-criticism that occur because of prejudice and perfectionism. The artistic practice is a field of unlimited experiment.
- A good work of art instigates the intelligence and touches the deepest feelings. Thus what’s good to a specific social group can mean nothing to another one. Human beings appreciate what is in their intellectual and sensitive reach. A boy that enjoys a specific type of music can change his preferences as the years go by because of changes in conscience and social influences. This process of mutation of conscience is continuous because the creature will always be beneath the possibilities of the Creator.
- Versatilism looks for artistic expressions that promote man and society, always respecting the artist’s level of understanding.
- In Versatilism, there are no art contests, as no man or group is capable of judging other men. An art critic always analyses a situation from a profoundly limited point of view because his knowledge is also limited. Contests and prizes can be a way of directing public opinion and on doing so, valorizing this or that artist that aims financial or social advantages. Nevertheless, ethical cultural initiatives are praiseworthy.
- Each person has style and freedom of choice. Trying to impose this or that way to the artist is the antithesis of what art means.
- In Versatilism, the artist does not have to be a slave of his own production. He can follow other paths or go back to his origins whenever he wants. The type of mercantilist procedure that requires such servitude load safes more than rejoices souls.
- As style, in Art History, it is possible to find artists that approached the Versatilist Aesthetics if not in all, in a great part of fundaments.

== See also ==
- Art manifesto
- Manifesto
