= April 1964 =

Month of 1964

<<	April 1964					>>
Su	Mo	Tu	We	Th	Fr	Sa
			1	2	3	4
5	6	7	8	9	10	11
12	13	14	15	16	17	18
19	20	21	22	23	24	25
26	27	28	29	30

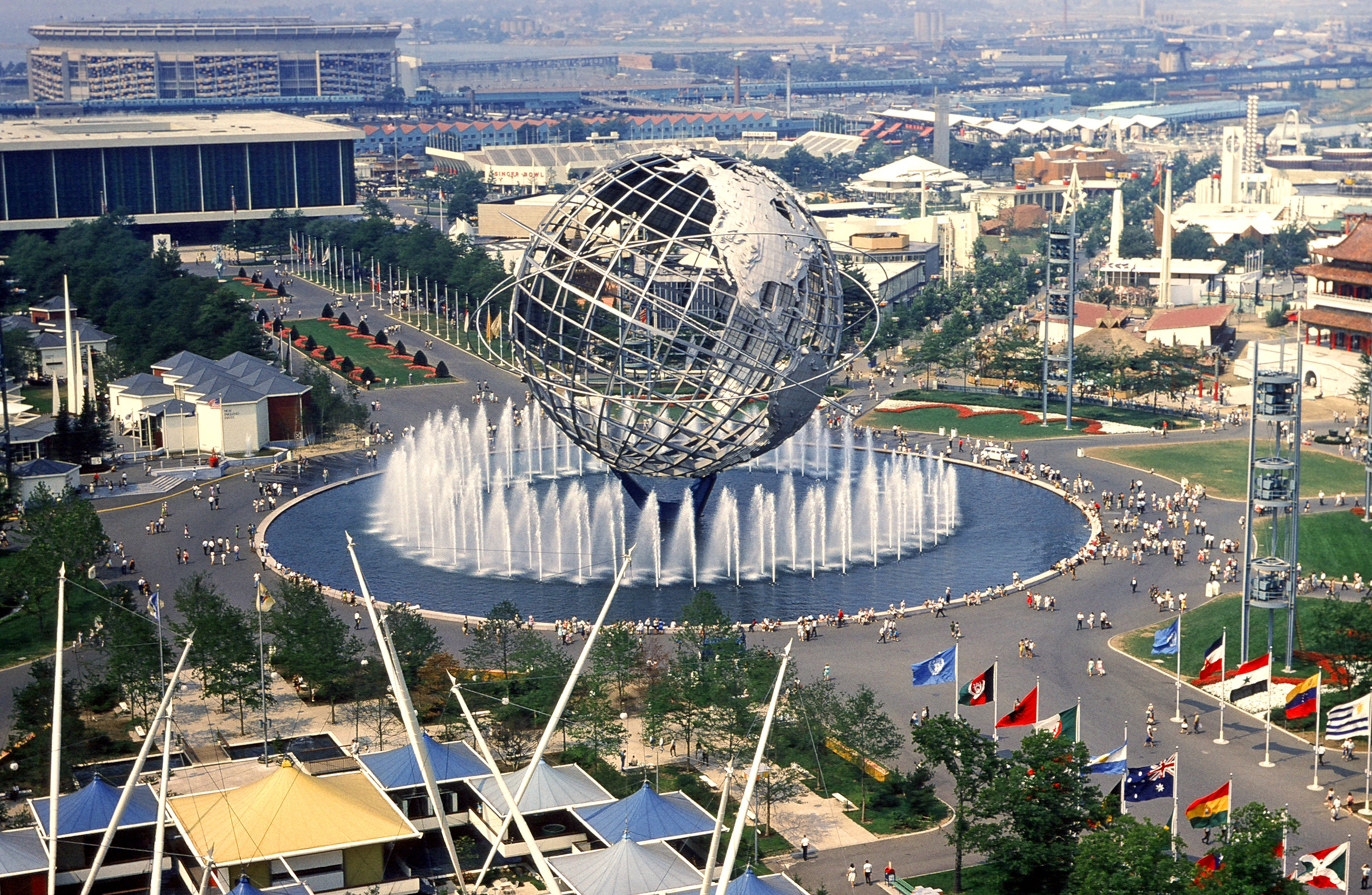
April 22, 1964: The New York World's Fair opens

April 4, 1964: Beatles' songs are ranked #1, #2, #3, #4 and #5 in most popular singles in the U.S. by Billboard

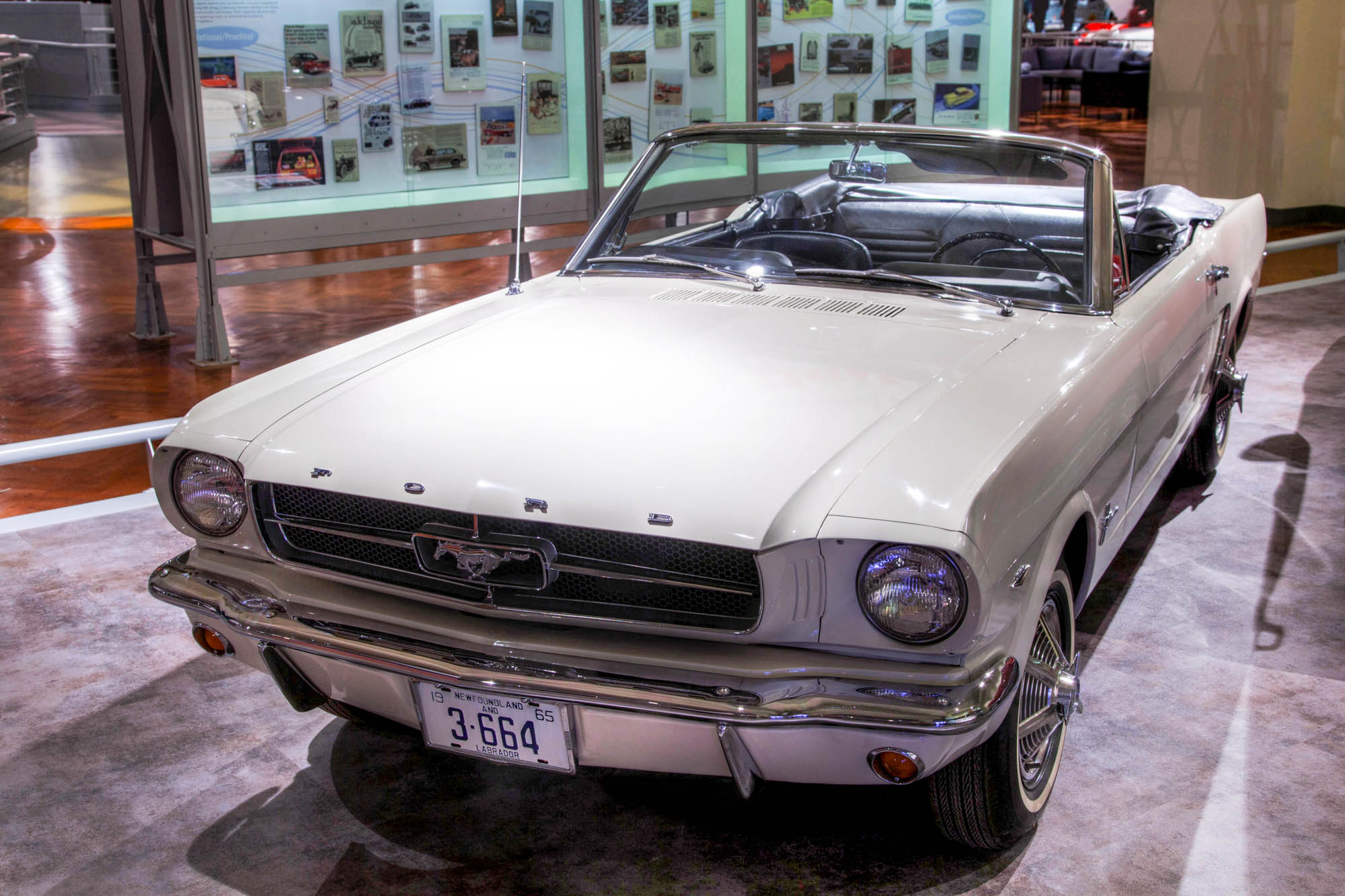
April 17, 1964: The Ford Mustang is introduced

The following events occurred in April 1964:

== April 1, 1964 (Wednesday) ==
- Queen Elizabeth II became the Lord High Admiral of the United Kingdom as part of the reorganisation of the defence of the nation. The post of First Lord of the Admiralty, held for the past year by the Earl Jellicoe, was abolished after 163 years. The position of Minister of Defence, held by Peter Thorneycroft, Baron Thorneycroft, became the Secretary of State for Defence.
- Most of the 12,000 physicians and dentists in Belgium went on strike and refused to treat patients, as a protest against a medical reform program that had gone into effect on January 1. The strike would end after 18 days, after Belgian government mobilization of all doctors benefiting from government assistance.
- Brazil's President João Goulart fled from Rio de Janeiro as rebel units of the 2nd Brazilian Army Corps approached the city to carry out a coup d'état. Goulart flew to Brasília, then to his home in Porto Alegre, where he pledged to take command of the Brazilian 3rd Army in a bid to reclaim his office.
- The Trident jet airliner began regular service, with British European Airways Flight 564 from London to Zürich.
- The Chrysler corporation introduced the Plymouth Barracuda.
- NASA astronauts visited to evaluate the Project Gemini translation and docking trainer and pointed out minor discrepancies which McDonnell corrected. Five days later, engineering evaluation was completed and the trainer was disassembled and shipped to for shipment to the Manned Spacecraft Center in Houston.
- Died: Alejandro Lavorante, 27, Argentine heavyweight boxing champion, died 18 months after being knocked out on September 21, 1962. Earlier in the year, he had fought, and been knocked out by, both Archie Moore and Muhammad Ali. Lavorante never woke up after a bout with Johnny Riggins.

== April 2, 1964 (Thursday) ==
- Ranieri Mazzilli, the presiding officer of Brazil's Chamber of Deputies, was sworn in as the new President of Brazil, while João Goulart abandoned further efforts to fight the coup leaders. Goulart and his family drove from his ranch in São Borja, and crossed the border to reach Santo Tomé in Argentina. U.S. President Lyndon Johnson, who was in favor of the ouster of Goulart by anti-Communist forces, sent a cable to Mazzilli, and called the relationship between the U.S. and Brazil "a precious asset in the interest of peace and prosperity and liberty in this hemisphere and in the whole world." Mazzilli would step down on April 15 when the Brazilian Congress elected Humberto Castelo Branco to the Presidency.
- The Soviet Union launched Zond 1 on a flyby of the planet Venus. Although the probe would pass within 100,000 kilometres (62,000 miles) of that planet on July 18, no data could be received because of a failure of transmitters in May and in June.
- Alfons Gorbach resigned as Chancellor of Austria and was succeeded by Josef Klaus, who would serve until 1970.
- Mrs. Malcolm Peabody, 72, mother of Massachusetts Governor Endicott Peabody, was released on $450 bond after spending two days in a St. Augustine, Florida jail for participating in an anti-segregation demonstration there.
- Testing of the Gemini No. 5 static vehicle (meant for evaluations rather than spaceflight, began in Texas at Galveston Bay. After two hours, testing halted when the test subjects became seasick. Among problems found were that one of the spacesuit ventilation fans failed, and the high-frequency whip antenna came loose.
- Died: Carlos Hevia, 64, President of Cuba for three days (January 15 to January 18, 1934)

== April 3, 1964 (Friday) ==
- Malcolm X gave his speech, "The Ballot or the Bullet", at the Cory Methodist Church in Cleveland, Ohio, calling on African-Americans to reconsider the policy of nonviolent resistance in pursuit of equal rights. "Don't be throwing out any ballots," he told the crowd; "A ballot is like a bullet. You don't throw your ballots until you see a target, and if that target is not within your reach, keep your ballot in your pocket." He closed by saying, "in areas where the government has proven itself either unwilling or unable to defend the lives and the property of Negroes, it's time for Negroes to defend themselves. This doesn't mean you're going to get a rifle and form battalions and go looking for white folks, although you'd be within your rights ... If the white man doesn't want the black man buying rifles and shotguns, then let the government do its job. That's all ... In 1964, it's the ballot or the bullet."
- The Communist Party of the Soviet Union issued a statement calling the Chinese Communist Party "the main danger to the unity of the world communist movement", and called for a summit of the leaders of the world's communist parties. Printed in the party newspaper Pravda, the CPSU wrote that "Peking is steering a course toward a split among the communist parties, toward the setting up of factions and groups hostile to Marxism-Leninism."
- Panama resumed diplomatic relations with the United States, after a split on January 17. An agreement between representatives of the two nations was signed at a meeting of the Council of the Organization of American States in Washington.
- Born:
  - Nigel Farage, British politician, MP of the European Parliament, and co-founder of the right-wing UK Independence Party; in Farnborough, Kent.
  - Bjarne Riis, Danish professional bicycle racer; in Herning
- Died: John Haynes Holmes, 84, African-American activist and co-founder of the NAACP and the ACLU

== April 4, 1964 (Saturday) ==
- The Beatles held the top five positions in the Billboard Top 40 singles in America, an unprecedented achievement. The top songs in America as listed on April 4, in order, were: "Can't Buy Me Love", "Twist and Shout", "She Loves You", "I Want to Hold Your Hand", and "Please Please Me". "No one had ever done anything even close to this before," an author would note later, "and it is doubtful the conditions will ever exist for anyone to do it again." The Beatles also held the 31st, 41st, 46th, 58th, 65th, 68th and 79th spots in Billboard's Hot 100.
- Born: David Cross, American standup comedian; in Atlanta

== April 5, 1964 (Sunday) ==
- Jigme Palden Dorji, the first Prime Minister of Bhutan, was shot and fatally wounded by an assassin while visiting the city of Phuntsholing. According to early reports, Dorji had been relaxing in a travelers home when the killer fired through an open window and shot him in the back. He died the next day. On April 8, a Bhutanese soldier named Jambay Dukpa confessed to firing the shot, after being arrested ten miles away at the city of Tala.
- A United States Marine Corps F-8C fighter crashed into a residential neighborhood at Hara Machida near Tokyo, killing four people on the ground and injuring 32 others. The F-8C malfunctioned and the aircraft's pilot ejected and was not seriously injured.
- Elections for the 99-seat Majlis an-Nuwwab began in Lebanon, and would continue on consecutive Sundays until May 3.
- Born: Christopher Reid, formerly known as Kid, comedian, actor, and rapper of the hip-hop duo Kid 'n Play; in The Bronx

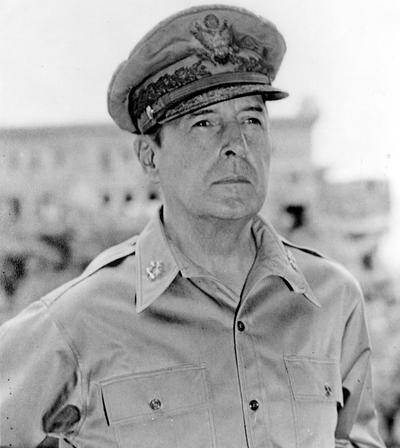
MacArthur

- Died: Douglas MacArthur, 84, U.S. Army five-star general and hero of World War II and the Korean War

== April 6, 1964 (Monday) ==
- A group of 16 employees of the IBM company, led by Gene Amdahl and Gerrit Blaauw, filed a patent application for a data processing system machine. U.S. Patent number 3,400,371 would be granted on September 3, 1968.
- Vatican City became associated with the United Nations with the creation of the Permanent Observer of the Holy See to the United Nations, allowing it to participate, but not to vote, in the UN General Assembly.
- Born: Tim Walz, American politician, Governor of Minnesota and vice presidential candidate; in West Point, Nebraska

== April 7, 1964 (Tuesday) ==
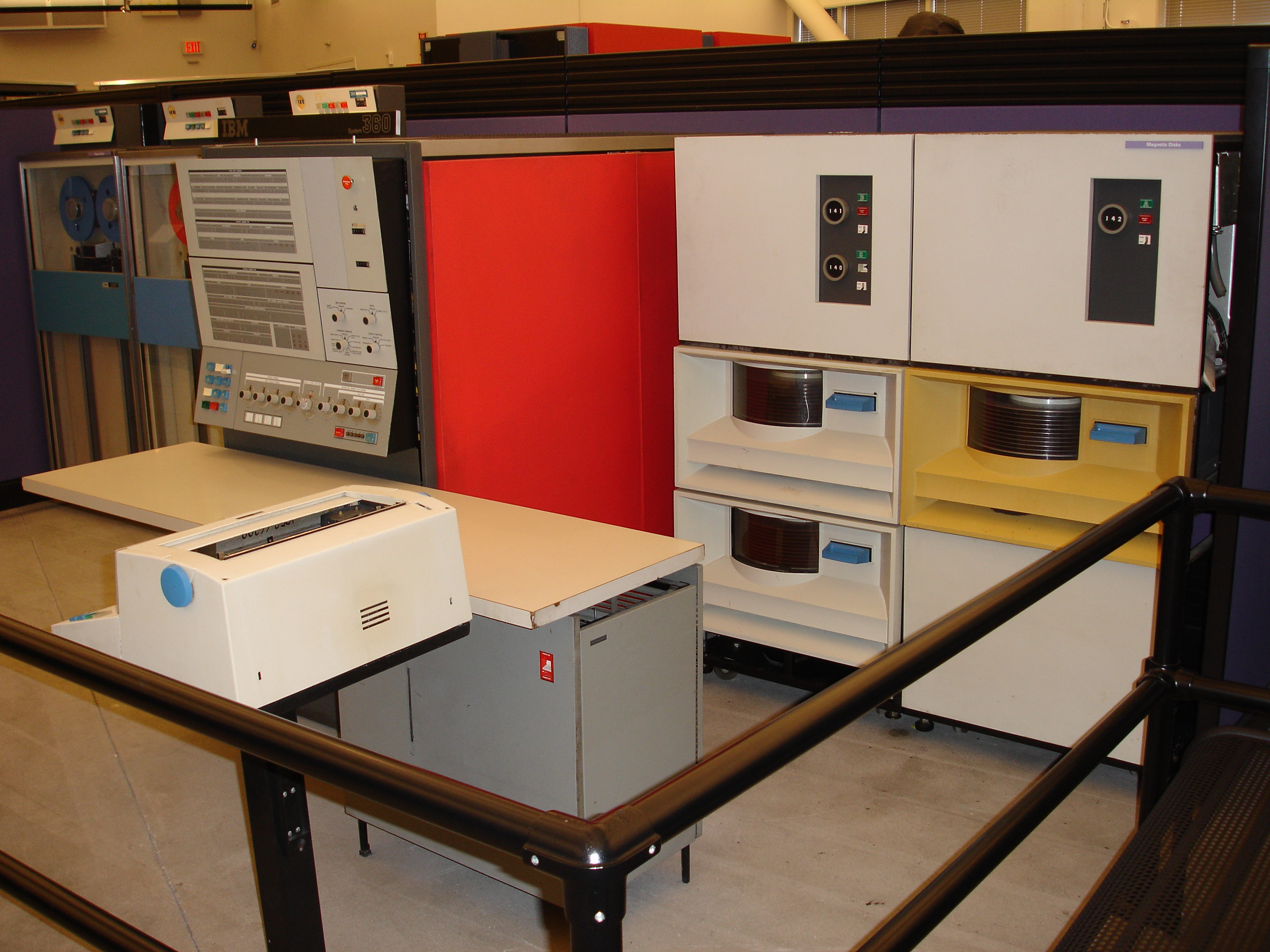
The IBM System/360, with 64 KB of core memory

- IBM announced the System/360 mainframe computer system, the first commercially available system to use micro-miniaturized logic circuits. The new machine, which IBM chairman Thomas J. Watson Jr. described as "the beginning of a new generation—not only of computers—but their application in business, science and government", was shown off at meetings in 165 cities before a total of 100,000 customers. The system could "accept messages from remote locations, no matter what the distance" and could "communicate simultaneously with 248 terminals". The most basic system had a storage of 8 kilobytes and the largest could accommodate 8 megabytes.
- The Ayatollah Ruhollah Khomeini, a Shi'ite Muslim cleric who would eventually be the leader of Iran, was released from prison in Tehran and permitted to relocate to the city of Qom.
- Born: Russell Crowe, New Zealand-born film actor; in Wellington
- Died:
  - Bruce W. Klunder, 26, American Presbyterian minister, was accidentally killed in Cleveland, Ohio, while protesting the construction of a new school that would have reinforced the Ohio city's pattern of racially segregated school districting. Klunder and three other protesters attempted to block the path of a bulldozer by lying down in its path, and the machine backed over him.
  - John Alan West, 53, English crime victim, was murdered during a burglary in his home in Workington. Gwynne Owen Evans and Peter Anthony Allen would be convicted of the murder and, on August 13, 1964, would become the last two people to be legally executed in the United Kingdom.

== April 8, 1964 (Wednesday) ==
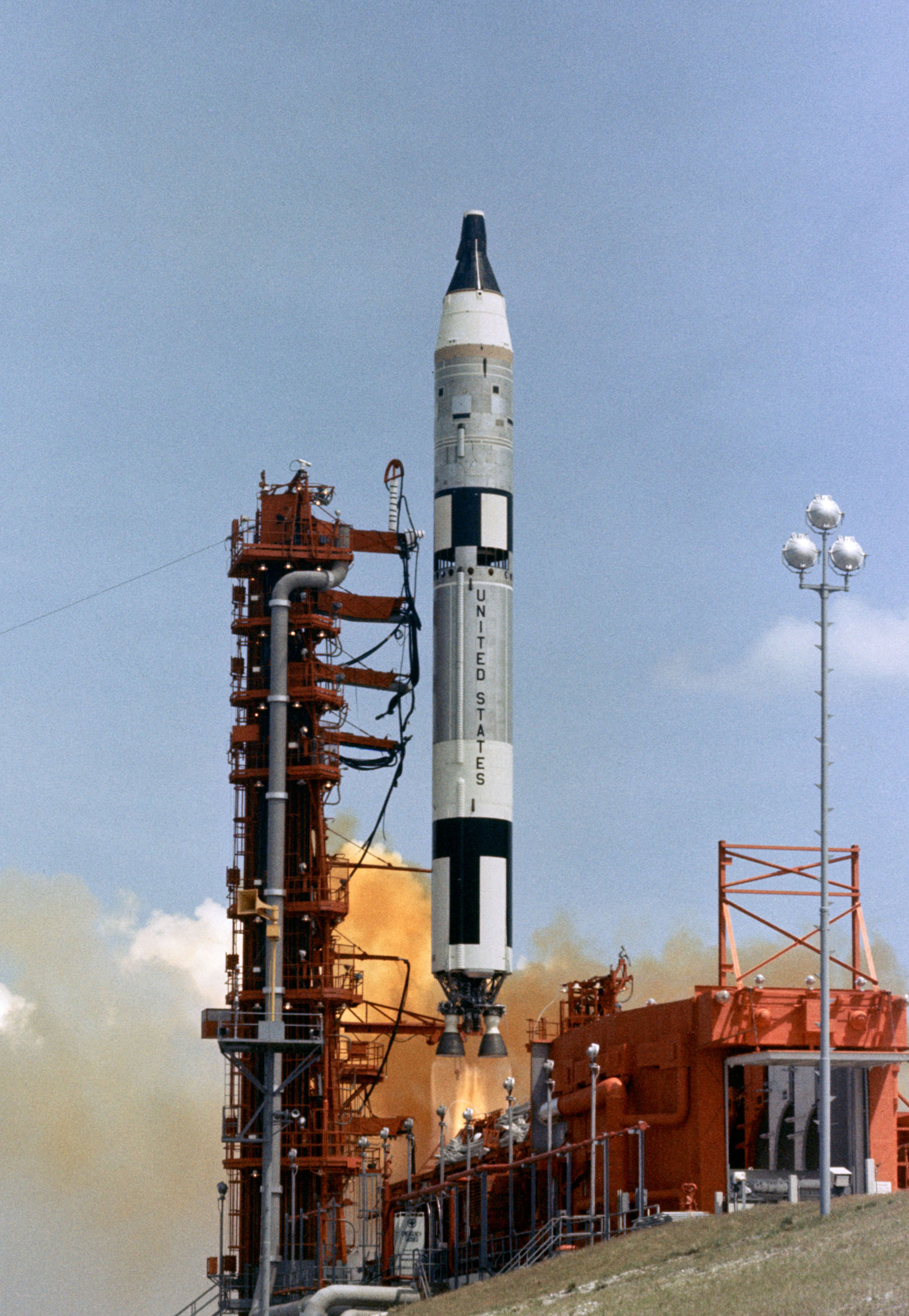
April 8, 1964: Launch of Gemini 1

- The United States launched its first Project Gemini spacecraft, capable of accommodating two astronauts and a successor to the one-astronaut Project Mercury capsules. The uncrewed Gemini 1 ship lifted off from Cape Kennedy, Florida, at 11:00 a.m. EST. Mission plans did not include separation of the Gemini spacecraft from stage II of the Titan II Gemini launch vehicle (GLV), and both were inserted into Earth orbit as a unit six minutes after launch. The planned mission included only the first three orbits and ended about 4 hours and 50 minutes after liftoff with the third orbital pass over Cape Kennedy. No recovery was planned for this mission, but Goddard continued to track the spacecraft until it reentered the atmosphere on the 64th orbital pass over the southern Atlantic Ocean (April 12) and disintegrated.
- Sheikh Abdullah, the former head of government of the Indian state of Jammu and Kashmir, was released from incarceration by the government of India after more than ten years of confinement on accusations of seeking Kashmir independence. Abdullah returned to Srinagar to a hero's welcome.
- Four of five railroad-operating unions struck against the Illinois Central Railroad without warning, bringing to a head a 5-year dispute over railroad work rules.
- The James Bond film, From Russia with Love, premiered in the United States, after its premiere in London six months earlier.
- Born: Biz Markie (stage name for Marcel Theo Hall), American rapper and DJ (d. 2021); in Harlem, New York City
- Died: Jim Umbricht, 33, American Major League Baseball pitcher who had appeared in 35 games in 1963 despite being terminally ill with cancer. His last game had been on September 29, as a member of the Houston Colt .45s (later the Houston Astros).

== April 9, 1964 (Thursday) ==
- Brazil's military government issued its first Institutional Act (Ato Institucional), providing that the President could suspend the political rights of any citizen for up to 10 years, giving him power to fire national, state and local legislators, and allowing the Brazilian Congress limited power to consider bills sent to it by the President. The Act also required Congress to elect a President at its April 11 session. The Institutional Act would end after two months, during which nearly 11,000 government employees, military officers, and political leaders had their rights suspended.
- The United Nations Security Council adopted, by a 9–0 vote, a resolution deploring a British air attack on a fort in Yemen 12 days earlier, in which 25 persons were reported killed.
- The 33rd and last Titan II research and development flight was launched from Cape Kennedy.
- Born:
  - Doug Ducey, American politician and businessman, Governor of Arizona from 2015 to 2023; in Toledo, Ohio
  - Lisa Guerrero, American investigative reporter; in Chicago

== April 10, 1964 (Friday) ==
- David Threlfall, a 20-year-old British science fiction fan from Preston, Lancashire, placed a wager with the William Hill PLC bookmaking company, which regularly offers odds and accepts bets on the timing and outcome of future events. Hill offered odds of 1,000 to 1 on the likelihood of “or any man, woman or child, from any nation on Earth, being on the Moon, or any other planet, star or heavenly body of comparable distance from Earth, before January, 1971” and Threlfall placed a bet of £10 (roughly $28 at the time) On July 20, 1969, Threlfall would be presented a check for £10,000 (worth $24,000 in 1969) on a live BBC broadcast, shortly after the safe landing of Apollo 11's lunar module on the Moon at 10:18 pm British Standard Time.
- Verda Welcome, the first black state senator in Maryland, was shot in Baltimore. The gunman, also an African-American, fired five shots at her as she was preparing to get out of her car. Mrs. Welcome had opened her door and was preparing to step out when she remembered some posters she had left in the back seat, and the shots came through the side windows while she was leaning over. As a result, she was grazed on her back and her heel rather than taking a direct hit, and told reporters later, "I'm happy to be among the living."
- Demolition of the Polo Grounds sports stadium commenced in New York City. The stadium had been the home of both football and baseball's New York Giants, and later for the New York Mets and the New York Jets.
- Glenn Gould, Canadian pianist, retired from public performances, with his final concert in Los Angeles.

== April 11, 1964 (Saturday) ==
- The Brazilian Congress elected Field Marshal Humberto de Alencar Castelo Branco as President of Brazil. General Castelo received 361 of 438 votes. Seventy-two Congressmen from the Labor Party, whose leader João Goulart had been overthrown the week before, chose to abstain rather than to vote for any candidate. Branco would serve until March 15, 1967, and would be killed in a plane crash four months later.
- A tornado in the Jessore District of East Pakistan (now Bangladesh) destroyed numerous villages and killed over 500 people, and perhaps as many as 2,000.
- Born: John Cryer, British politician who has served as Member of Parliament for Leyton and Wanstead since 2010; in Darwen, Lancashire

== April 12, 1964 (Sunday) ==
- The People, a London tabloid newspaper, broke a story titled "The Biggest Sports Scandal of the Century", naming three First Division players of The Football League as having been party to the fixing of soccer football matches while they had played for Sheffield Wednesday F.C. in 1962. According to the story, Peter Swan, Tony Kay and David "Bronco" Layne had bet £50 that their team would lose to Ipswich Town F.C. on December 1, 1962, and made a £100 profit when Ipswich won, 2–0. The "Sheffield Wednesday trio" would be among 10 players sentenced to prison in 1965, and would serve four months' incarceration.
- Died: Wallace "Bud" Werner, 28, American skier, and Barbara Henneberger, 23, West German Olympic ski racer, were both killed in an avalanche near Samedan in Switzerland, where they were part of a group of 31 skiers participating in the filming of Ski-Faszination.

== April 13, 1964 (Monday) ==
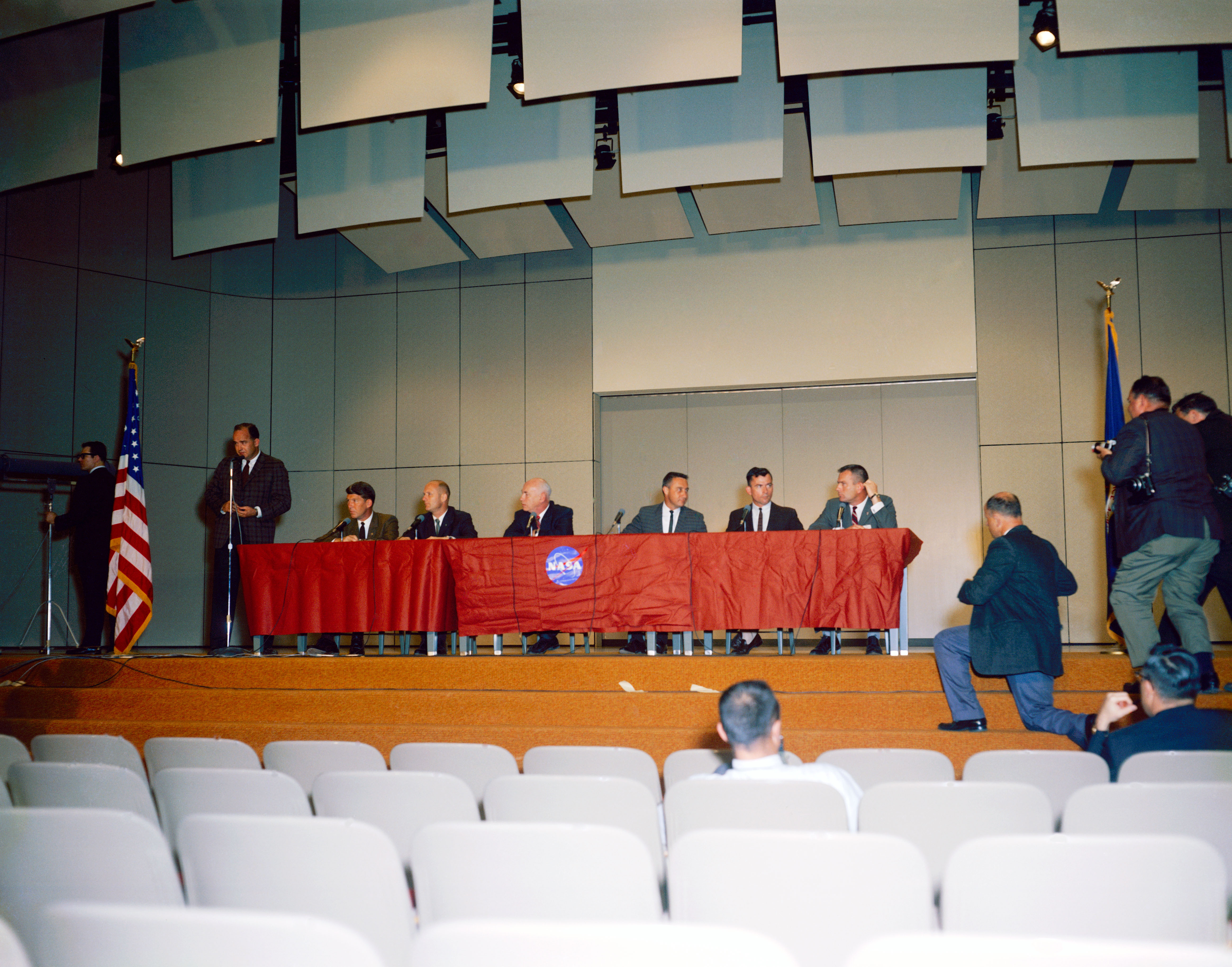
April 13, 1964: Press conference announcing Gemini 3 crew

- Robert R. Gilruth, Director of NASA's Manned Spacecraft Center, announced that Virgil I. Grissom and John W. Young would be the two astronauts on Gemini 3, the first U.S. flight to carry more than one person. Walter M. Schirra, Jr., and Thomas P. Stafford were named as the backup crew.
- In one of the first recorded instances of a crowd shouting for a suicidal person to jump from a building, people in Albany, New York, chanted "Jump! Jump!" to a man on the roof of the 11-story DeWitt Clinton Hotel. A crowd of about 3,000 people had gathered to watch when boys in the crowd shouted to him to make the 125-foot (38 m) plunge and even made bets on whether he would go through with his plan. The 19-year-old young man was eventually persuaded by police and his seven-year-old nephew to return to abandon his plan.
- Ian Smith was elected as the new leader of the Rhodesian Front political party and became the new Prime Minister of Southern Rhodesia. Smith would guide the declaration of independence of Rhodesia from the United Kingdom in order to establish a white-minority government that would exclude black Africans from participation.
- The 36th Academy Awards ceremony was held. Sidney Poitier became the first black person to win an Academy Award in the category Best Actor in a Leading Role, for his performance in Lilies of the Field, while Patricia Neal received Best Actress for Hud, and Tom Jones won the award for Best Motion Picture.
- The Pietà, sculpted by Michelangelo in 1498 and 1499, arrived in the United States from the Vatican for display at the New York World's Fair. The 6,700-pound (3,000 kg) statue was brought in on the Italian Line ocean liner SS Christoforo Colombo.
- The Space Systems Division (SSD) of the U.S. Air Force recommended launching a Gemini Agena target vehicle launch on a non-rendezvous mission before undertaking a space rendezvous. Gemini Project Office (GPO) rejected the plan as incompatible with the flight schedule, but accepted SSD's alternate suggestion that one Agena vehicle become a development test vehicle (DTV) to permit more extensive testing, along with modifications by Lockheed Corporation plant. Gemini Agena target vehicle (GATV) 5001 became the, the designated DTV, became the first Agena for the Gemini program.
- Malcolm X departed on the Hajj, the pilgrimage to Mecca. For the next seven months, he would tour the Middle East and Africa, returning to New York City on November 24.
- Born:
  - Caroline Rhea, Canadian comedian, actress and first host of the TV show The Biggest Loser; in Westmount, Quebec
  - John Swinney, Scottish politician, First Minister of Scotland since 2024; in Edinburgh
- Died:
  - U.S. Marine Corps General Melvin Maas, 65, former U.S. Congressman for Minnesota (1927–1933 and 1935–1945), who fought in World War II during his time in Congress and was blinded by a war injury.
  - Veit Harlan, 64, Nazi German film director and anti-Semitic propagandist

== April 14, 1964 (Tuesday) ==
- In St. John's, Newfoundland, a Ford dealership made the first retail sale of a Ford Mustang, three days before the car was to be introduced. Stanley Tucker, a commercial pilot for Canadian Eastern Provincial Airlines, spotted the car at the George Parsons dealership and "made an offer that could not be refused to one over-zealous salesman". The Ford Motor Company would reacquire the vehicle a year later, in return for giving Mr. Tucker a new 1966 Mustang convertible, and the vehicle is now located in The Henry Ford museum in Dearborn, Michigan.
- Three NASA technicians were killed and eight others injured when a motor on the third stage of a Delta rocket ignited inside an assembly room at Cape Kennedy and sprayed burning fuel on the people who were placing a payload atop the stage. Sidney Dagle, L. D. Gabel and John Fassett were burned over more than 83% of their bodies and died soon after the accident, while four other men were seriously injured.
- The United Nations Civilian Police (UNCIVPOL) began its first mission, assisting the peacekeeping operations performed in Cyprus by UNFICYP. The agency's name would later be shortened to the United Nations Police, or UNPOL.
- British Chancellor of the Exchequer Reginald Maudling announced in the House of Commons that he was raising taxes on alcohol, beer and cigarettes.
- Died: Rachel Carson, 56, American marine biologist and conservationist, died of a heart attack brought on by cancer and radiation treatment

== April 15, 1964 (Wednesday) ==
- The 17.6-mile-long (28.3 km) Chesapeake Bay Bridge–Tunnel was opened to traffic after four years and $200 million of construction. The link between Kiptopeke and Virginia Beach, Virginia, replaced the car ferry that had been used by travelers driving along the Eastern Shore of the United States.
- The trial of the Great Train Robbers concluded in Aylesbury, Buckinghamshire, with the judge describing the robbery as "a crime of sordid violence inspired by vast greed" and passing sentences of 30 years' imprisonment on seven of the robbers.
- Fifteen days after the 1964 Brazilian coup d'état, the Army Chief of Staff, Marshal Humberto de Alencar Castelo Branco, was inaugurated as president, with the intention of overseeing a reform of the political-economic system.
- The South Kasai insurrection in southern Congo finally ended after two years and the deaths of more than 15,000.
- After reviewing the results of Gemini 1, NASA's Gemini Management Panel concluded that concluded Gemini 2 could launch as early as August 24 and Gemini 3 (the first with a crew) on November 16. Gemini 2 would launch on January 19, 1965, and Gemini 3 on March 23.

== April 16, 1964 (Thursday) ==
- Sentences totaling 307 years were passed on 12 men who stole £2.6 million in used bank notes after holding up the night mail train traveling from Glasgow to London in August 1963—a heist that became known as the Great Train Robbery. Judge Edmund Davies told Roger Cordrey, "you are the first to be sentenced out of certainly 11 greedy men whom hope of gain allured."
- President Adolf Schärf opened the Donauturm, Austria's tallest structure at 252 metres (827 ft), in the Donaustadt district of Vienna.
- The Rolling Stones released their self-titled debut album, recorded by Decca and placed on sale in the United Kingdom.
- Representatives of NASA and Boeing signed the contract for the design and construction of the Lunar Orbiter.
- Grahame Wood opened the first Wawa at 1212 MacDade Boulevard in Folsom, Pennsylvania.
- Born: Esbjörn Svensson, Swedish jazz pianist; in Skultuna (killed in scuba-diving accident, 2008)

== April 17, 1964 (Friday) ==
- Jerrie Mock arrived in Columbus, Ohio, in a Cessna 180, completing a solo round-the-world flight and becoming the first woman to make such a journey. Mock landed the "Spirit of Columbus" on April 17 at 9:36 p.m., 29 days after her departure from the same airport on March 19. Pilot Joan Merriam Smith, who had departed on her own round-the-world trip on March 17, had made it as far as the Australian city of Darwin on April 17. Jerrie Mock's circumnavigation had been a journey of 22,858.8 miles (36,787.7 km) and 21 stops.
- All 51 people on Middle East Airlines Flight 444 were killed when the Caravelle jet crashed in the Persian Gulf after overshooting the runway while trying to land at the airport in Dhahran in Saudi Arabia. Flight 444e had departed Beirut two hours earlier and had had an uneventful flight until getting caught in powerful winds from a sandstorm as it was preparing to arrive.
- In the U.S., the Ford Mustang was first put on sale at Ford dealerships nationwide, with a suggested retail price of $2,368, and had purchases and purchase requests for more than 22,000 units on the first day. In its first year on the market, there would be 418,812 of the Mustangs purchased, making it "the most successful new car ever introduced".
- Shea Stadium opened in Flushing, New York, as 48,736 people watched the New York Mets host the Pittsburgh Pirates. The Mets, perennial losers in their third National League season, lost the game, 4–3, on a 9th inning single by the Pirates' Willie Stargell.
- The U.S. Air Force completed Operation Helping Hand, an airlift that had started on March 28, after bringing 1,850 short tons (1,680 metric tons) of relief equipment and supplies to Anchorage, Alaska, in the aftermath of the March 27 earthquake there.
- Byron De La Beckwith was freed on a $10,000 bond after his second trial for the murder of Medgar Evers ended with another hung jury in Jackson, Mississippi. The all-white jury was reportedly split 8 to 4 in favor of an acquittal after 10 hours of deliberation.
- Born:
  - Rachel Notley, Canadian politician and Premier of the province of Alberta from 2015 to 2019; in Edmonton, Alberta
  - Maynard James Keenan, American frontman of Tool; in Ravenna, Ohio
  - Lela Rochon, American actress; in Little Rock, Arkansas

== April 18, 1964 (Saturday) ==
- An 11-year-old boy in Mill Valley, California, got his hands caught in a rope and was taken to an altitude of 3,000 feet (910 m) while dangling below a hot air balloon. Danny Nowell had joined three boys who had volunteered to hold the balloon steady and, as he told reporters later, "the balloon took off and everybody let go but me." The balloonist, William Berry, was unable to hear Danny's screaming until he shut off the propane gas burners. At that point, Berry realized that the boy was suspended 30 feet (9.1 m) below the balloon's gondola and began spilling air to make a fast descent at 25 feet per second. Ten minutes after the frightening ride began, Danny was safely rescued from a tree in a residential backyard at 537 Browning Court in Tamalpais Valley.
- RTF Télévision 2, France's second television station (officially La deuxième chaîne), began regular programming on Channel 22 on the UHF dial after initially experimenting on January 1.
- Belgium's doctor strike came to an end after 18 days with an accord between the physicians' representatives and the Belgian government.
- Jack Brabham won the 1964 Aintree 200 motor race.
- Born:
  - Zazie (stage name for Isabelle de Truchis de Varennes), French singer-songwriter; in Boulogne-Billancourt
  - Lourenço Mutarelli, Brazilian comic book artist; in São Paulo
  - Niall Ferguson, British economic historian; in Glasgow
- Died: Ben Hecht, 70, American film screenwriter

== April 19, 1964 (Sunday) ==
- In Laos, a right-wing military group, led by Brigadier General Kouprasith Abhay, deposed the coalition government of Prince Souvanna Phouma. Souvanna and other cabinet members were placed under house arrest, and the Geneva Accords that had kept an uneasy peace with the left-wing Pathet Lao were on the verge of collapsing while U.S. Ambassador to Laos Leonard S. Unger was out of town. Unger returned to the Laotian capital of Vientiane and rushed to Souvanna's residence where, as one historian would later note, a "'Romeo and Juliet' scene took place, as Souvanna Phouma stood at a balcony on the second floor and expressed his desire to discontinue premiership, while Ambassador Unger stood on the ground begging him to continue to head the government." Assured of U.S. support for his government, Souvanna resumed his duties as Prime Minister and would remain in that office until 1975.
- In Argentina, the transmission of the LV 84 TV Channel 6 signal in the Province of Mendoza was inaugurated.

== April 20, 1964 (Monday) ==
- BBC Two, the third television network of the United Kingdom (after BBC and ITV) was scheduled to go on the air at 7:20 in the evening with a ten-minute segment, Line-Up, with John Stone and Denis Tuohy delivering a brief summary of news and weather and Pamela Donald commenting on programming. With 625 lines resolution, the BBC-2 broadcasting was more clear than the 405-line BBC telecasts, but it was viewable only by people with the newer TV sets. At 7:30, The Alberts Channel Too, a variety program by the comedy team The Alberts, was set to be the first original TV series. Only 25 minutes before airtime, however, a fire at Battersea Power Station caused a power failure in much of London, including the BBC Television Centre. For the rest of the evening, people who could tune in were only able to see a sign that said "BBC 2 Will Start Shortly". Power would be restored, and broadcasting would begin, the next day.
- U.S. President Lyndon Johnson in New York, and Soviet Premier Nikita Khrushchev in Moscow, simultaneously announced plans to cut back the production of materials for making nuclear weapons.
- Nelson Mandela made his "I Am Prepared to Die" speech at the opening of the Rivonia Trial. The address would become an inspiration in the continuing anti-apartheid movement.
- The first jar of Nutella, a "hazelnut cocoa spread" now popular around the world, was shipped from the Ferrero SpA factory in Italy.
- Born:
  - Crispin Glover, American film actor best known as George McFly in Back to the Future; in New York City
  - Andy Serkis, English pioneer in motion capture animation; in Ruislip
- Died: Dimitar Ganev, 65, President of Bulgaria since 1958. Ganev's title as Chairman of the Presidium of the National Assembly of Bulgaria served to make him the nation's head of state, although actual power was wielded by Todor Zhivkov, the General Secretary of the Bulgarian Communist Party.

== April 21, 1964 (Tuesday) ==
- What has been described as "the first major space accident to seriously affect Earth" happened with the failed launch of a SNAP-9A, one of a series of nuclear-powered generators launched by the U.S. Navy between 1961 and 1972. The SNAP (Systems for Nuclear Auxiliary Power) package was included with a payload that carried the Transit 5BN-3 navigational satellite, and was launched from Vandenberg Air Force Base in California but the Thor-Able-Star rocket "failed to achieve orbit" and the SNAP broke up in the stratosphere over the southern Indian Ocean burned up in the upper atmosphere. The result was that a large amount of the radioactive isotope plutonium-238 was showered across a wide area.
- U.S. President Johnson told a group of 800 editors and broadcasters that the United States should go beyond the "War on Poverty" at home, and work at eliminating poverty throughout the rest of the world as well, commenting that "if we sit here just enjoying our material resources, if we are content to become fat and flabby at 50, and let the rest of the world go by, the time will not be far away when we will be hearing a knock on our door in the middle of the night ... clamoring for freedom, independence, food and shelter—just as our revolutionary forefathers clamored for it."
- With electrical power restored, BBC Two was able to launch programming at 11:00 in the morning with the first episode of Play School, an educational program aimed at preschool-age children.
- James Baldwin's Blues for Mister Charlie opened on Broadway.
- Born: Ludmila Engquist, Russian track athlete, cancer survivor, and gold medalist (1996) in the women's 100m hurdles; in Tambov Oblast, Russian SFSR, Soviet Union
- Died: Bharathidasan (pen name for Kanagasabai Subbu), 72, Tamil poet and activist

== April 22, 1964 (Wednesday) ==
- The 1964 New York World's Fair opened to celebrate the 300th anniversary of New Amsterdam being taken over in 1664 by British forces under the Duke of York (later King James II) and being renamed New York. The fair would run until October 18, 1964, then make a second run from April 21 to October 17, 1965. Since less than ten years had passed since the Seattle World's Fair in 1962, the New York exposition was not internationally approved, but many nations would have pavilions with exotic crafts, art and food. Five students from St. Peter's College in Jersey City, New Jersey, camped outside of Gate Number 1 for two days so that they could be the first in line. Bill Turchyn was the first of the five to go through the gate.
- Convicted Nazi war criminal Walter Zech-Nenntwich escaped from a West German maximum security prison in Braunschweig, a few days after being sentenced to four years at hard labor for his role in helping kill 5,254 Jews in the Soviet city of Pinsk. Zech-Nenntwich was aided by being able to open six unlocked doors and then helped over a 15-foot (4.6 m) high wall. He and a woman friend then hired an airplane at Nordhorn and flew to Switzerland, landing at Basel. From there, he fled to Egypt. After more than three months on the run, he would voluntarily surrender to West German authorities on August 7. By then, it would be revealed that the warden at the Braunschweig jail, Hans Zeeman, had been the escapee's friend during the Nazi era. Walter Zech-Nenntwich was then jailed in Hannover where, the press was told, "there are no wardens there with Nazi backgrounds."
- A threatened nationwide strike of United States railroad workers was called off 55 hours before it was to start at 12:01 on Saturday, as federal mediators conferred with representatives of labor and management at a meeting in the private family quarters of the White House.
- British businessman Greville Wynne, imprisoned in Moscow since 1963 for spying, was exchanged for Soviet spy Gordon Lonsdale.

== April 23, 1964 (Thursday) ==
- Tanganyikan President Julius Nyerere made the surprise announcement that he and Zanzibar's President Abeid Karume had agreed to merge their two nations. Nyerere and Karume had signed the agreement at a meeting at the State House of Zanzibar while Sheik Mohammed Babu, a Communist "regarded as the real power in Zanzibar", was out of the country on a tour of Asia.
- Sir Garfield Barwick resigned as both Attorney General and Minister for External Affairs in order to accept appointment as Chief Justice of Australia. Barwick was selected by Prime Minister Robert Menzies to replace the retiring Chief Justice, Sir Owen Dixon.
- Georgi Traykov, who had occupied the post of "first deputy prime minister" of Bulgaria since 1949, was selected by the National Assembly to be the new President of the Presidium, replacing the late Dimitar Ganev as Bulgaria's head of state.

== April 24, 1964 (Friday) ==
- With a little more than a day's notice to his advisers and the Secret Service, the President and Mrs. Johnson spent the day meeting crowds in Illinois, Indiana, Pennsylvania, West Virginia and Kentucky to prepare his announcement for a comprehensive program to fight poverty in the United States. Following an evening rally in Chicago the night before, the U.S. president flew by helicopter to talk to schoolchildren in South Bend, Indiana. He then flew on Air Force One from an Indiana air force base for a rally in front of 250,000 people at Pittsburgh, then to Huntington, West Virginia, for a meeting with eight state governors. From Huntington, Johnson helicoptered to the small mountain hamlet of Inez, Kentucky, and another small town, Paintsville, to meet well-wishers, before catching Air Force One at Huntington again and returning to Washington. During his visit to Inez, Johnson sat on a pile of lumber at the porch of the impoverished, 10-member, Thomas Fletcher family and chatted for half an hour. Along the way, he spoke to everyone about his $250,000,000 plan to help the Appalachian poor.
- For the first time in more than 30 years, it became legal to possess a United States gold certificate, as U.S. Treasury Secretary Douglas Dillon announced the rescission of a 1933 regulation that had been issued in conjunction with an Executive Order by President Roosevelt. On August 28, 1933, the U.S. government had ordered all citizens to exchange their gold certificates and gold coins for other currency, no later than January 30, 1934. Until Dillon eased the rules, "anyone—collector, dealer, private citizen, or even a museum" was subject to a 10-year prison sentence and a $10,000 fine, although "no one in Washington today could remember that happening."
- An earthquake in the Tajik SSR of the Soviet Union (now Tajikistan) caused a large section of the Darovorz mountain peak to dam up the Zeravshan River. Residents of the small town of Ayni were evacuated as a large artificial lake was created, with water levels rising 30 feet (9.1 m) in the first 24 hours. The expansion of the flood threatened the Uzbek SSR city of Samarkand, about 100 miles (160 km) downriver from the dam. "Unless immediate measures are taken," an unidentified official said, "200 million cubic meters of water will accumulate in just one month."
- A new law went into effect in East Germany, designating all lands within five kilometres (3.1 miles) of the nation's boundary with West Germany as special border areas where residents were required to carry special passes issued by the Stasi, and where a curfew was in effect nightly from 11 p.m. to 5 a.m. A resident within the border area was now required by law to call police to report the presence of any unauthorized person, and failure to do so could result in a term of up to two years in prison.
- Thieves stole the head of the Little Mermaid statue in Copenhagen. The Danish government announced that if the stolen head could not be found, a new head would be cast from the original mold and welded on to the statue.
- The Vienna Convention on Diplomatic Relations, signed on April 18, 1961, entered into force.
- Born:
  - Cedric the Entertainer (stage name for Cedric A. Kyles), American TV comedian and game show host; in Jefferson City, Missouri
  - Augusta Read Thomas, American classical composer; in Glen Cove, New York
- Died: Gerhard Domagk, 68, German bacteriologist and 1939 Nobel Prize laureate who discovered and synthesized the first commercially available antibiotic, Prontosil (sulfamidochrysoidine).

== April 25, 1964 (Saturday) ==
- Parliamentary elections were held in Malaysia for the then 159-member Dewan Rakyat for the second time since independence, and for the last time in Singapore prior to its secession from Malaysia. The Alliance Party (Parti Perikatan), a coalition of Malayan, Chinese and Indian politicians, increased its overwhelming majority in the lower house, taking 89 of 104 contested seats, but future Singaporean prime minister Lee Kuan Yew won a seat for the new People's Action Party.
- The Toronto Maple Leafs beat the visiting Detroit Red Wings, 4–0, to win Game 7 of the 1964 Stanley Cup Finals and their third consecutive championship in the National Hockey League.
- Born:
  - Hank Azaria, American film and TV actor known for voicing many characters in the animated sitcom The Simpsons; in Los Angeles
  - Andy Bell, English singer and lead vocalist of the synth-pop duo Erasure; in Dogsthorpe, Peterborough
  - Vince Offer, Israeli-born American comedian and pitchman; as Offer Shlomi in Beersheba

== April 26, 1964 (Sunday) ==
Tanganyika

Zanzibar

Tanzania

- At 12:01 a.m., the United Republic of Tanganyika and Zanzibar officially came into existence after the national assembly of Tanganyika joined Zanzibar in voting to approve the merger of the two East African republics, announced three days earlier by Tanganyikan President Julius Nyerere and by Abeid Karume, the President of Zanzibar. At the time, Tanganyika had 9,000,000 inhabitants and the island of Zanzibar had 300,000. Nyerere became president, and Karume Vice President, of the new nation. In July, the government would announce a contest for a new name for the United Republic, and the winning entry—Tanzania—would be announced by Nyerere on October 29. April 26 continues to be celebrated as "Union Day" in Tanzania.
- Thomas Toolen, the Roman Catholic Archbishop of the archdiocese of Mobile, Alabama, ordered the desegregation of all Roman Catholic parochial schools in his jurisdiction, which included all of the state of Alabama, and 11 counties in Florida west of the Apalachicola River. "I know this will not meet with the approval of many people," Toolen wrote in a pastoral letter read at all congregations at Sunday services, "but in justice and charity, this must be done."
- Several hundred African-Americans met in Jackson, Mississippi, to organize the Mississippi Freedom Democratic Party, an alternative to the all-white state Democratic Party.
- The Boston Celtics beat the San Francisco Warriors, 105–99, to win the NBA Championship, four games to one. The victory marked the Celtics' sixth consecutive title.
- Died:
  - Jacinto Cruz Usma, Colombian terrorist and bandit chief known as "Sangrenegra", was killed near the town of Las Brisas in the Valle del Cauca Department, after a gun battle with the 8th brigade of the Colombian Army. During a four-year period, Sangrenegra and his associates murdered 223 policemen and public officials. Jacinto's brother, Felipe Cruz, had tipped off the army after Jacinto had threatened to kill him and his family.
  - E. J. Pratt, 82, Canadian poet

== April 27, 1964 (Monday) ==
- The Tobacco Institute, an American trade group of the nation's cigarette manufacturers, announced that the companies had agreed on a code for future advertising that would guarantee that ads and commercials would "not represent that cigarette smoking is essential to social prominence, distinction, success, or sexual attraction". Specifically, the tobacco companies agreed no longer to use endorsements by athletes and celebrities, to discontinue distributing free cigarette samples to persons under 21, and to halt promotions on school and college campuses.
- U.S. President Johnson outraged animal lovers during a photo session, when he lifted his pet beagles by the ears while playing with them on the White House lawn. After hearing the dogs—named "Him" and "Her"—yelp, a reporter asked, "Why did you do that?" and Johnson explained that it was to make them bark, adding, "And if you've ever followed dogs, you like to hear them yelp."
- The last original episode of The Danny Thomas Show was telecast on CBS, bringing an end to the 11-year run of Thomas's situation comedy that had premiered on ABC on September 29, 1953, as Make Room for Daddy.
- Died: Dimitri Alexandrovich Obolensky, 82, Russian nobleman and historian

== April 28, 1964 (Tuesday) ==
- Four days after his tour of West Virginia and eastern Kentucky, President Johnson sent proposed legislation to Congress for what would become the Appalachian Regional Development Act, "a long-range program of economic rehabilitation of the impoverished 10-state Appalachian region". In his letter to the President pro tempore of the U.S. Senate and to the Speaker of the House, Johnson wrote that the U.S. economic program had bypassed the 15 million residents of the mountainous areas "for reasons which are cheerlessly clear" and proposed a seven-point program for 2,350 miles (3,780 km) of road improvement, construction of flood control, timber management and agricultural enhancement, reclamation of mined lands and modernization of safe mining practices, and vocational training.
- Serial killer Joseph Francis Bryan, Jr. was spotted at a shopping center in New Orleans, 14 days after he was added to the FBI's Most Wanted list, and arrested in the parking lot with an 8-year-old boy whom he had kidnapped from Humboldt, Tennessee, the week before. Dennis Burke had been the fifth young boy who had been abducted by Bryan in the past two months. The other four had been murdered. In the absence of sufficient evidence to support murder charges in the other four cases, Burke would plead guilty to the Tennessee kidnapping and be sentenced to life in prison.
- Soviet engineers set off a massive conventional explosion as the first step of creating a canal through the massive landslide that had been damming the Zeravshan River since Friday. The dam, created by the toppling of a mountain peak into the river following an earthquake, was reported to be at least 150 metres (490 ft) high and up to 400 metres (1,300 ft) wide.
- Japan became the first new member (and the first Asian member) of the Organisation for Economic Co-operation and Development (OECD) since its founding by 20 western nations in 1961.
- Born:
  - L'Wren Scott (stage name for Laura "Luann" Bambrough), American stylist and fashion designer; in Salt Lake City (died by suicide, 2014)
  - Lady Helen Taylor, British royal, only daughter of the Duke and Duchess of Kent; at Coppins, Buckinghamshire
  - Barry Larkin, American baseball player; in Cincinnati
- Died: Milton Margai, 68, Prime Minister of Sierra Leone since its independence in 1961. He was succeeded by his half-brother, Albert Margai.

== April 29, 1964 (Wednesday) ==
- After seven days of technical problems, the first animatronics replication of a human being was unveiled to visitors to the New York World's Fair, who watched the show "The Disneyland Story presenting Great Moments with Mr. Lincoln" at the Fair's Illinois pavilion. The figure of former U.S. President Abraham Lincoln was programmed with "nearly 275,000 possible combinations of gestures and movements" that were synchronized with pre-recorded speech and was the first product of Disney's Audio-Animatronics engineering. After seven performances, however, "the lifelike electronic Lincoln" stopped working for the day.
- The sinking of a passenger ferry in East Pakistan (now Bangladesh) drowned at least 250 people. The vessel was on its way from Dacca when it sank in the Bay of Bengal, about 30 miles (48 km) from its destination of Chandpur.
- Pakistan International Airlines began regular scheduled flights to Beijing, becoming the first airline of a non-communist nation to have regular service to both the People's Republic of China and to the Soviet Union.
- The 1964 Cannes Film Festival opened.
- C. Howard Robins, Jr., and others in the MSC Advanced Spacecraft Technology Division formulated a tentative flight plan for using a Gemini spacecraft to link up with an orbiting vehicle to achieve a long-duration space mission (dubbed the "Pecan" mission). The two astronauts were to transfer to the Pecan for the duration of the mission. As with similar investigations for the application of Apollo hardware, the scheme postulated by Robins and his colleagues emphasized maximum use of existing and planned hardware, facilities, and operational techniques.
- Died: J. M. Kerrigan, 79, Irish character actor on film and on stage

== April 30, 1964 (Thursday) ==
- Arnold S. Zander, the founder of the 220,000-member AFL-CIO State, County and Municipal Employees (SCME) and its president since 1936, was defeated by challenger Jerry Wurf by a margin of only 21 votes at the labor union's national convention in Denver. The final vote was 1,450 for Wurf, and 1,429 for Zander. Delegates then approved Wurf's motion to declare Zander "President Emeritus", with the full $21,000 annual salary until retirement.
- Born: Barrington Levy, Jamaican reggae musician; in Clarendon
- Died: Howard Buffett, 60, American businessman and politician, father of Warren Buffett
