= Denis Mandarino =

Brazilian composer, artist and writer

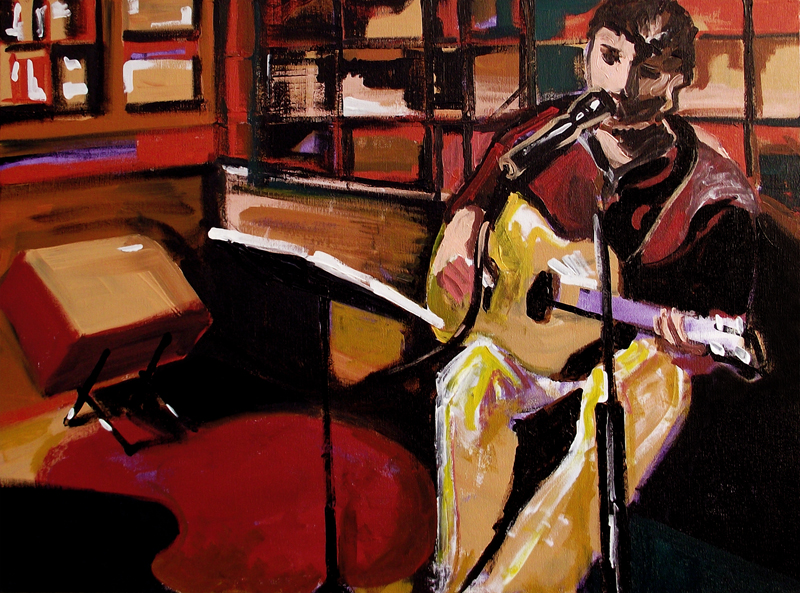
- Self-portrait (2006), 50 × 70 cm, acrylic on canvas

Background information
- Born: May 7, 1964 (age 61); São Paulo, São Paulo, Brazil
- Genres: MPB, classical, rock
- Instrument(s): Guitar, bass, acoustic guitar, mandolin
- Years active: 1983–present
- Website: www.denismandarino.com

Denis Garcia Mandarino (born May 7, 1964) is a Brazilian composer, artist and writer, and a disciple of Hans-Joachim Koellreutter in choral conducting and aesthetics.

He proposed a theory about four-dimensional perception, which states the concepts behind the renaissance perspective involving four dimensions instead of three dimensions assigned to it. These studies culminated in the development of the method of the four-dimensional perspective.

Mandarino wrote the Versatilist manifesto (2007).

== Versatilism ==
Versatilism is an artistic movement proposed in 2007, from a literary manifesto, with the intention of freeing people from the expert analysis and promoting the practice of art as a form of self-knowledge and spiritual enhancement.

"New ideas are hard to identify, hard to assimilate, and only detachment may be able to evaluate them in a more open way. When a man assumes the role of giving the verdict about what artists are doing, or the society gives him this role, we are one step closer to repeat the greatest injustices that men of science, philosophy, arts and religion have suffered throughout history." – Interview about the Versatilist Manifesto

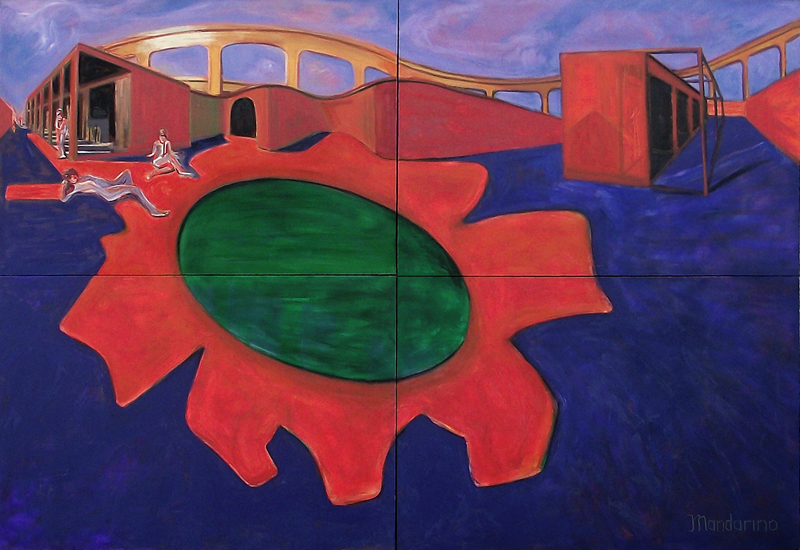
Quadriptych Observation in time (1997), 240 × 160 cm, acrylic on canvas

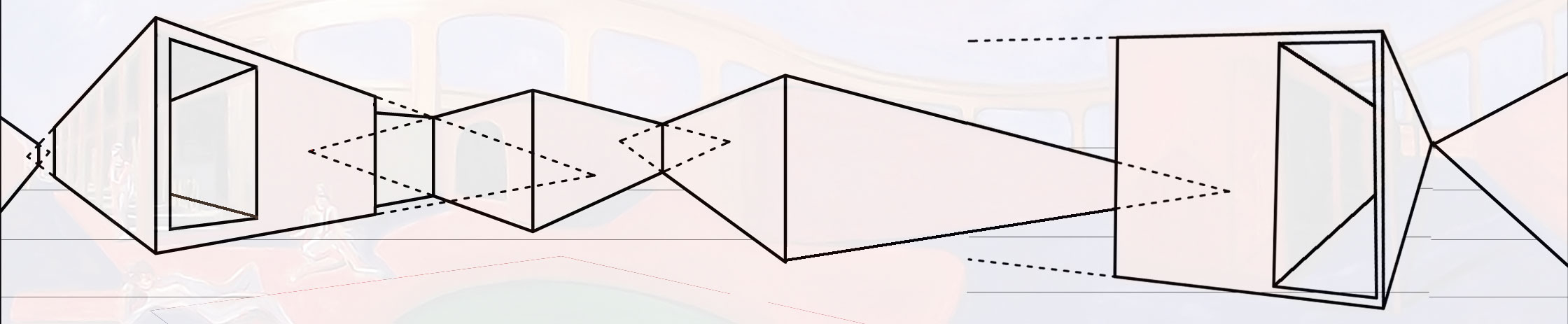
Four-dimensional perspective with nine vanishing points. The ninth point is outside the limits of the canvas.

== Four-dimensional perspective ==
After spending four years writing the Theory of four-dimensional perception (1995), Mandarino developed a new method, in a subject for many years stagnant. In the perspective of four dimensions, the observer is not a static element (fixed point), as one sees in traditional processes.

In Observation in time (1997) can be found nine different vanishing points and horizon lines, representing different moments of an observer who turns his head and moves vertically and horizontally.

This kind of painting admits curved or spherical canvas.

== Discography ==
The discography includes the following albums:

1. Volume 1 – 2003
2. Tributo – 2004
3. Peças para Violão – 2005
4. Instrumental – 2006
5. Musa – 2007
6. Renascentieval – 2008
7. A Sociedade do Rei e o Xadrez – 2009
8. Um toque de humor – 2009
9. Improvisos, variações, releituras... – 2010
10. Reconstruções – 2011
11. Tributo 2 – 2012
12. Versátil – 2013
13. Nem Só para Crianças – 2015

== Gallery ==
=== Portraits ===
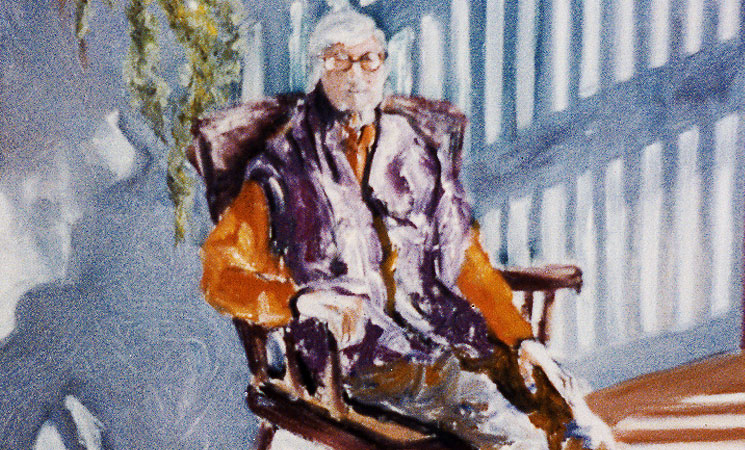
Grandma (detail), 50 × 70 cm, oil on canvas

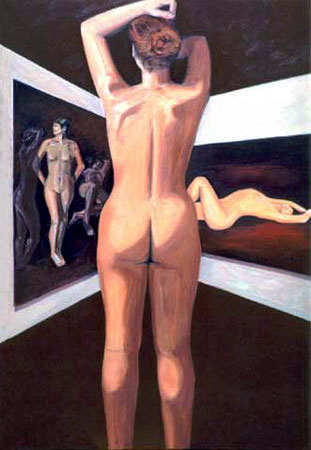
Room of models, 80 × 120 cm, oil on canvas

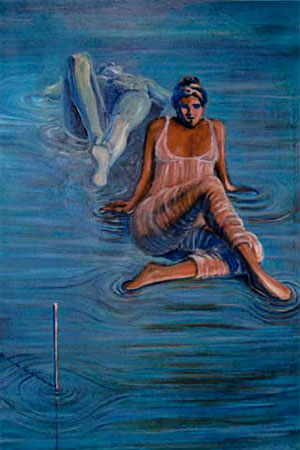
Landscape in blue and orange, 80 × 120 cm, oil on canvas

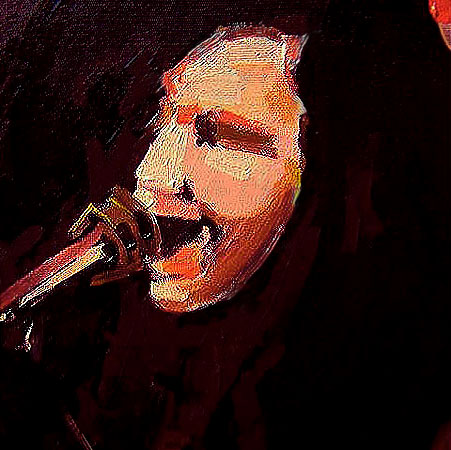
Samia's portrait, acrylic on canvas

=== Guardians ===
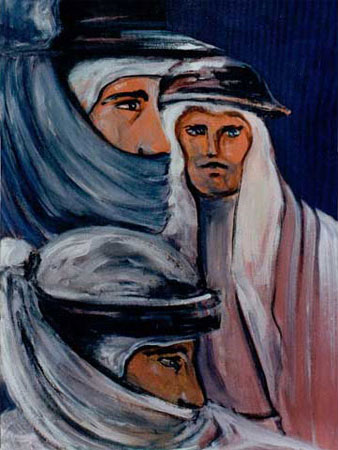
Bedouins (guardians series), 50 × 70 cm, acrylic on canvas

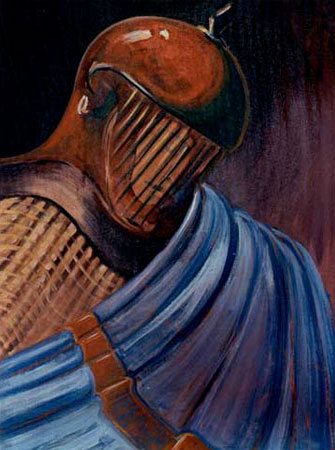
Knight (guardians series), 50 × 70 cm, acrylic on canvas

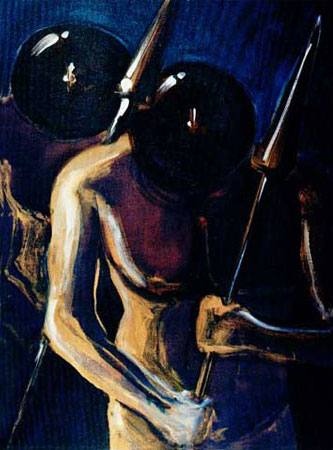
Mary's Lancers (guardians series), 50 × 70 cm, acrylic on canvas

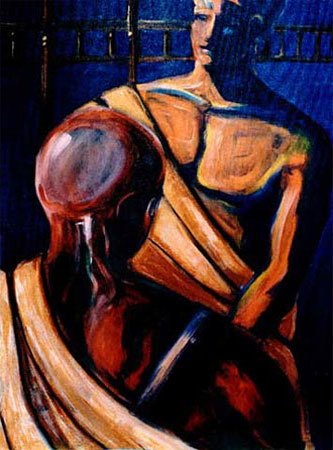
Roman Soldiers (guardians series), 50 × 70 cm, acrylic on canvas

"Querubim e o mandolim"
Guitar and percussion.

"Indelével"
Serialism.

"Imprevisível"
Harpsichord and acoustic guitar.

"Ilusão na noite"
Two guitars.
