= Hans-Joachim Koellreutter =

Brazilian composer, teacher and musicologist

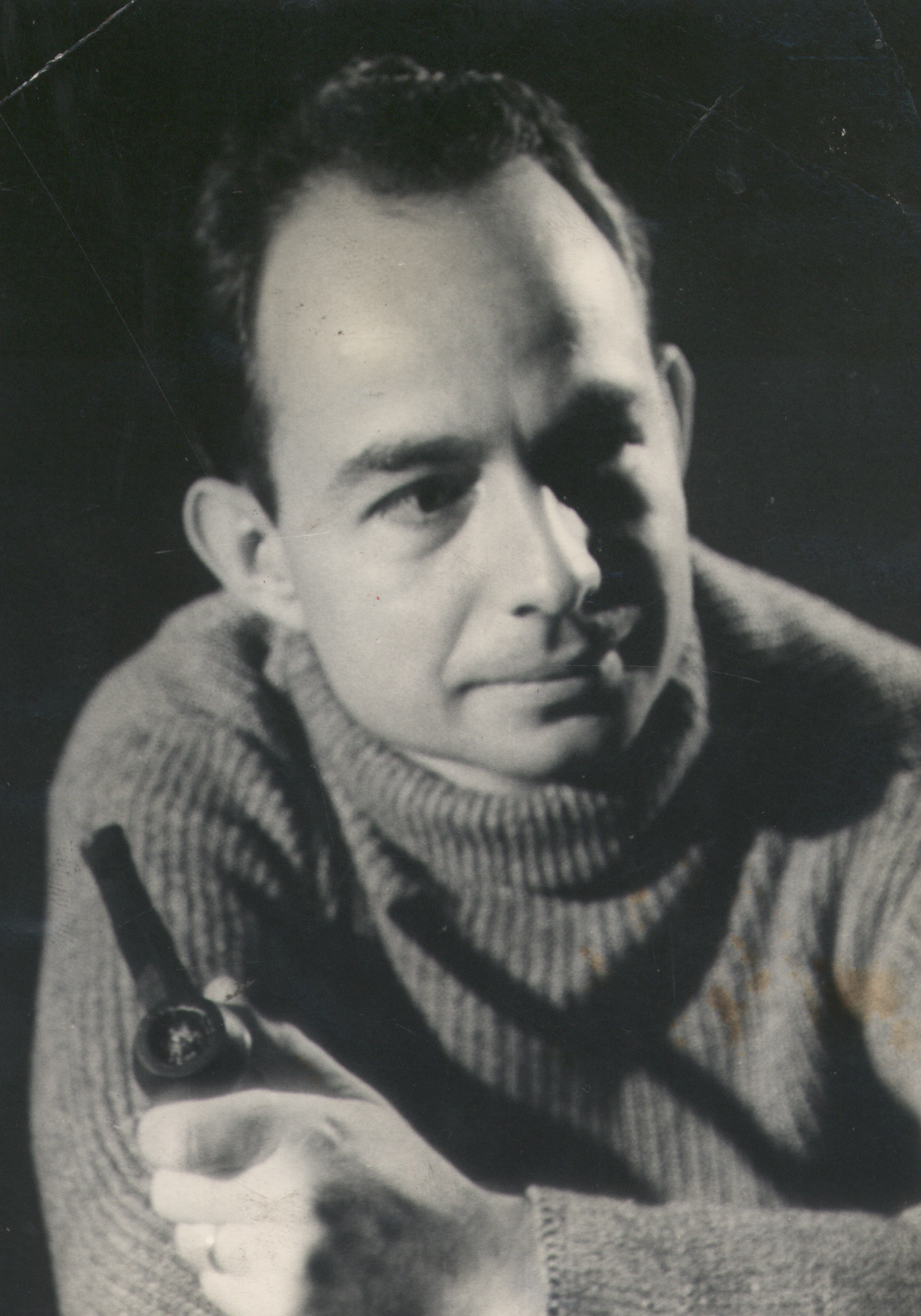
- Hans-Joachim Koellreutter; National Archives of Brazil
- Born: 2 September 1915; Freiburg, Germany
- Died: 13 September 2005 (aged 90); São Paulo, Brazil
- Occupations: composer, teacher and musicologist
- Known for: brought the theory of atonal music to Brazil
- Notable work: created the group Musica Viva

Hans-Joachim Koellreutter (2 September 1915 – 13 September 2005) was a Brazilian composer, teacher and musicologist.

Koellreutter was born in Freiburg, Germany and lived in Brazil from 1937 onward, where he became one of the country's most influential musicians.

In Brazil Koellreuter taught many prominent composers, including Gilberto Mendes, Cláudio Santoro, Antônio Carlos Jobim, Denis Mandarino, Jayme Amatnecks, among others.

He brought the theory of atonal music to Brazil, creating the group "Musica Viva" and inflating the debate between the "Nationalists" and "Serialists".

While the former group believed in the use of folklore material for the development of their compositions, the latter believed that the more rational approach of the European school was the path to truly contemporary works. This debate played a central role in the esthetic developments of Brazilian classical music throughout the 20th century.

== Death ==
Koellreutter died in São Paulo, Brazil, 11 days after his 90th birthday.
