= September 1960 =

Month of 1960

<<	September 1960					>>
Su	Mo	Tu	We	Th	Fr	Sa
				1	2	3
4	5	6	7	8	9	10
11	12	13	14	15	16	17
18	19	20	21	22	23	24
25	26	27	28	29	30

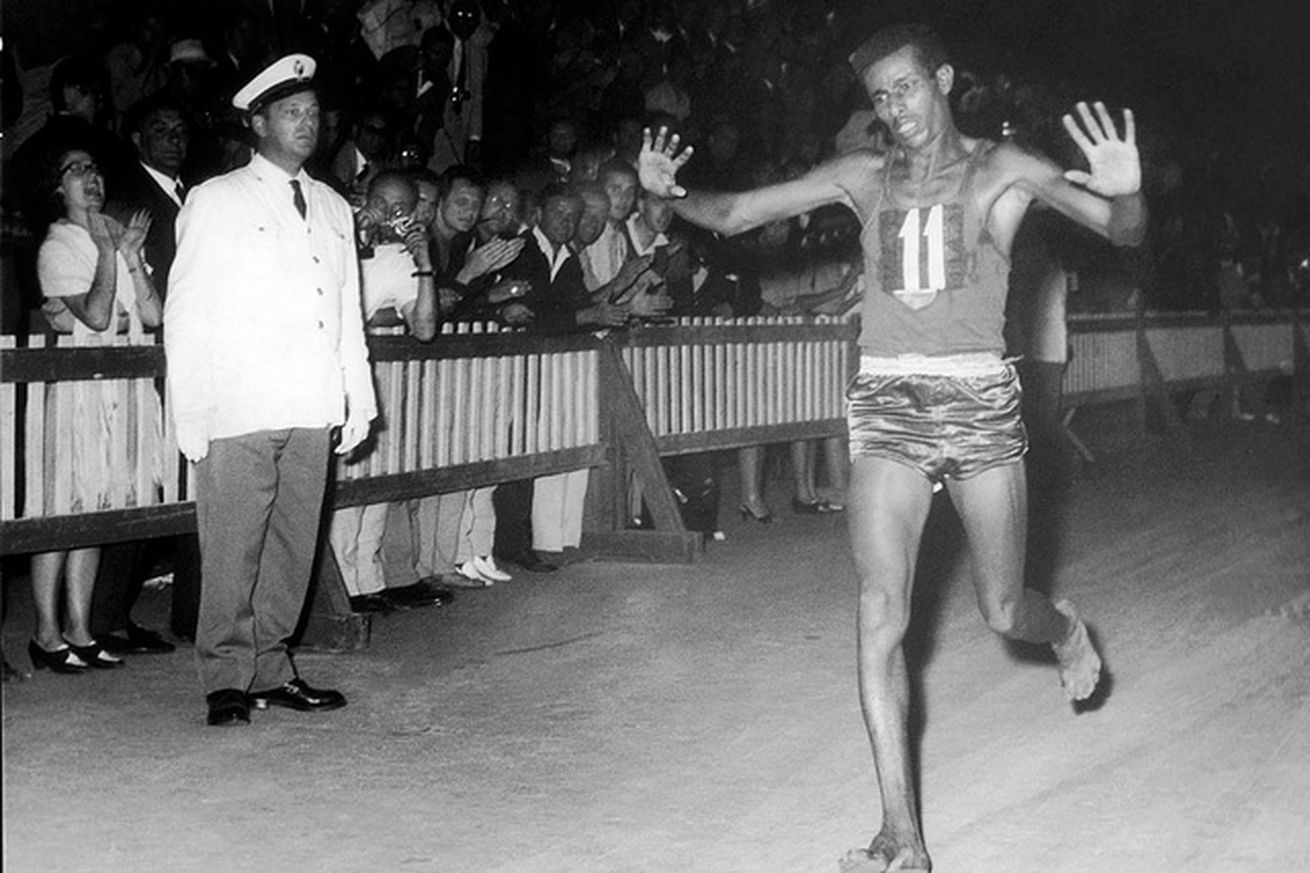
September 10, 1960: Ethiopia's Abebe Bikila wins the Olympic marathon while running barefoot

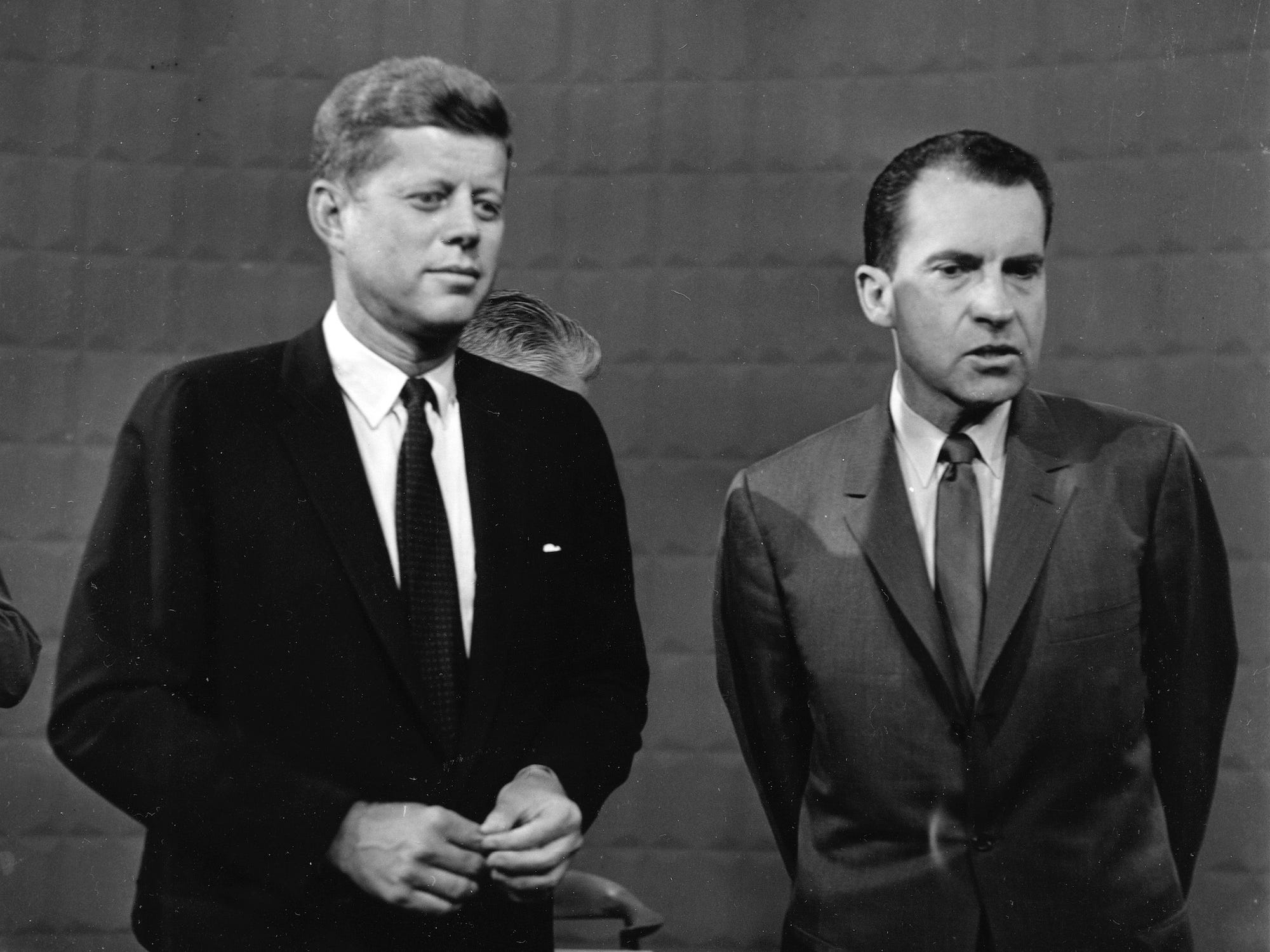
September 26, 1960: Senator John F. Kennedy and Vice-president Richard M. Nixon appear in Chicago for the first-ever U.S. presidential debate.

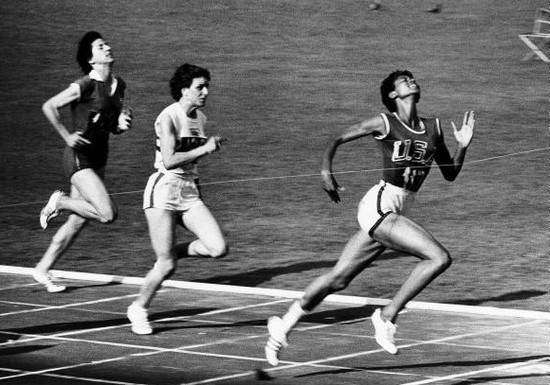
September 2, 1960: American polio survivor Wilma Rudolph wins women's 100-meter dash

September 4, 1960: Oil-producing nations form OPEC

The following events occurred in September 1960:

== September 1, 1960 (Thursday) ==
- The lights of Times Square were turned off for one minute, and London's West End lights were dimmed in recognition of the contribution of lyricist Oscar Hammerstein II, who died on August 23.
- Disgruntled maintenance workers went on strike and halted operations of the Pennsylvania Railroad, marking the first shutdown in the company's history. The walkout ended two days later.
- Mercury spacecraft No. 6 was delivered to Cape Canaveral for the Mercury-Atlas 2 uncrewed mission.
- A five-day ban was imposed on West Germans entering East Berlin.
- Born: Eric Adams, American politician and former police officer, 110th Mayor of New York City, in office since 2022; in Brownsville, Brooklyn, New York City
- Died:
  - Dr. Francis Townsend, 93, American activist whose "Townsend Plan" for the elderly was an influence upon the creation of the Social Security system.
  - Sultan Hisamuddin Alam Shah, 62, the head of state and monarch of the Federation of Malaya as Yang di-Pertuan Agong, died on the day that he was scheduled to officially take office. Hisamuddin had become the Sultan of Selangor, one of the Federation's states, in 1938, and was selected to be the new monarch in April.

== September 2, 1960 (Friday) ==
- In the Summer Olympics, Wilma Rudolph, who had overcome childhood polio, won the women's 100 meter dash with a time of 11.0 seconds. Although faster than the world record of 11.3, Rudolph's mark was not official because the wind had been blowing faster than 2.0 m/s. Rudolph earned three golds, including the 200 m dash and the 4 × 100 m relay. In the long jump competition, Ralph Boston of the United States broke the Olympic record that had been set in 1936 by Jesse Owens. Boston was 4 inches (100 mm) short of the world record of 26 feet 11 3/4 inches (8.21 m) that he had set on August 12.
- Near Grafenwöhr, West Germany, 16 American soldiers were killed and 26 injured when an 8-inch howitzer shell crashed into them during a morning roll call. The shell had been overloaded with charge and went 4 1/2 miles beyond its target.
- Aeroflot Flight 804 crashed while bringing back 13 passengers and five crewmen from the Soviet Air Force's Arctic base at Mys Shmidta.
- Born:
  - Doug Polen, American motorcyclist and 1993 world motorcycling champion; in Detroit
  - Eric Dickerson, NFL running back and Hall of Famer; in Sealy, Texas

== September 3, 1960 (Saturday) ==
- In the bloodiest day of fighting since the Congo became independent of Belgium, more than 300 people were killed and 700 wounded as Congolese troops invaded the "Mining State" that had been declared by Albert Kalonji in the Kasai Province. Government troops loyal to Patrice Lumumba had retaken the cities of Mwene Ditu and Laputa, while Kasai rebels were marching to defend the major city of Bakwanga (now Mbuji-Mayi).
- The first Hardee's Restaurant was opened, by Wilber Hardee, as a drive-in in Greenville, North Carolina. By 1997, when the parent company of California's Carl's Jr. chain purchased the eastern chain, Hardee's would have 3,152 franchises in 40 U.S. states and 10 foreign nations.

== September 4, 1960 (Sunday) ==
- Before a crowd of 100,000 at the Santiago Bernabéu Stadium, Real Madrid of Spain defeated Peñarol of Uruguay, 5 to 1, to win the first Intercontinental Cup soccer football championship. The Intercontinental Cup was the product of an agreement between UEFA and CONMEBOL to create a faceoff between the winners of the European Champions' Cup and the new South American club championship, the Copa Libertadores; as with the continental championships, the intercontinental winner was being determined by the aggregate score of two matches, one in each club's home field. In the first match, played at Montevideo on July 3, Uruguayan and Spanish teams had a 0 to 0 draw.
- Hurricane Donna struck Puerto Rico, where it killed 107 people before moving northward through the United States, where it killed 22 more people before dying down by September 13.
- The 1960 Italian Grand Prix at Monza was won by Phil Hill.
- Born: Damon Wayans, American comedian; in New York City
- Died: William F. O'Neil, 75, multimillionaire founder of General Tire

== September 5, 1960 (Monday) ==
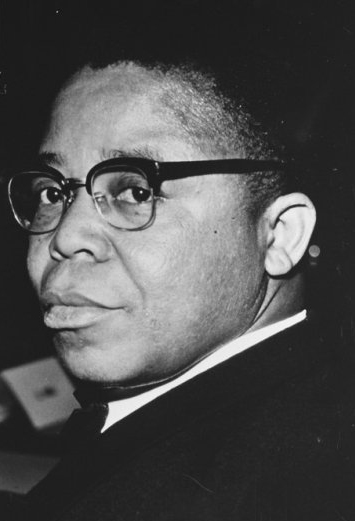
Kasavubu, fired by Lumumba

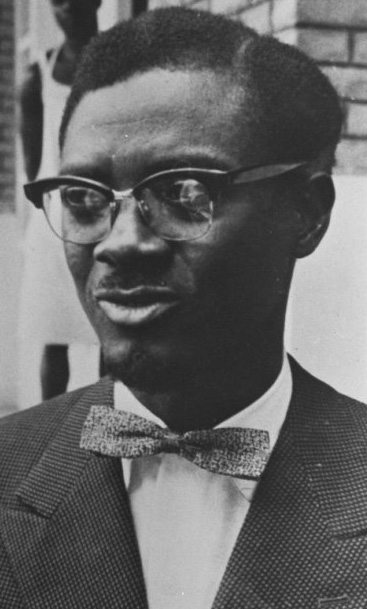
Lumumba, fired by Kasavubu

- In the Congo, President Joseph Kasavubu announced on Radio Leopoldville that he had fired Prime Minister Patrice Lumumba. An hour later, Lumumba announced on the same station that he intended to stay, and then fired Kasavubu. Congo's Army Chief of Staff Joseph Mobutu sent troops to place Lumumba under house arrest while contemplating the future of Kasavubu's regime.
- Cassius Clay of the United States (later Muhammad Ali) defeated Zbigniew Pietrzykowski of Poland to win the gold medal in the Olympic light heavyweight boxing competition. Franco De Piccoli of Italy was the Olympic heavyweight boxing medalist.
- Died: Earl K. Long, 65, former Governor of Louisiana, died nine days after being elected to Congress. Long had gone to the hospital after polls closed on August 27.

== September 6, 1960 (Tuesday) ==
- The Manifesto of the 121 (Déclaration sur le droit à l’insoumission dans la guerre d’Algérie) was published in the French magazine Vérité-Liberté, calling on the government of France to recognise the justice of the Algerian independence movement. It was signed by leading cultural figures, including Jean-Paul Sartre, François Truffaut and Simone Signoret.
- At the men's 400 metre dash, the Olympic record of 45.9 seconds was broken by the first four finishers. Otis Davis of the U.S. and Carl Kaufmann of Germany were both credited with a new world record of 44.9 (with Davis winning gold by 0.02 seconds), Malcolm Spence of South Africa at 45.5, and Milkha Singh of India at 45.6.
- William H. Martin and Bernon F. Mitchell, two National Security Agency cryptologists who had been missing since June 24, were introduced as defectors to the Soviet Union at a press conference in Moscow's House of Journalists.
- Died: György Piller, 61, Hungarian world champion fencer

== September 7, 1960 (Wednesday) ==
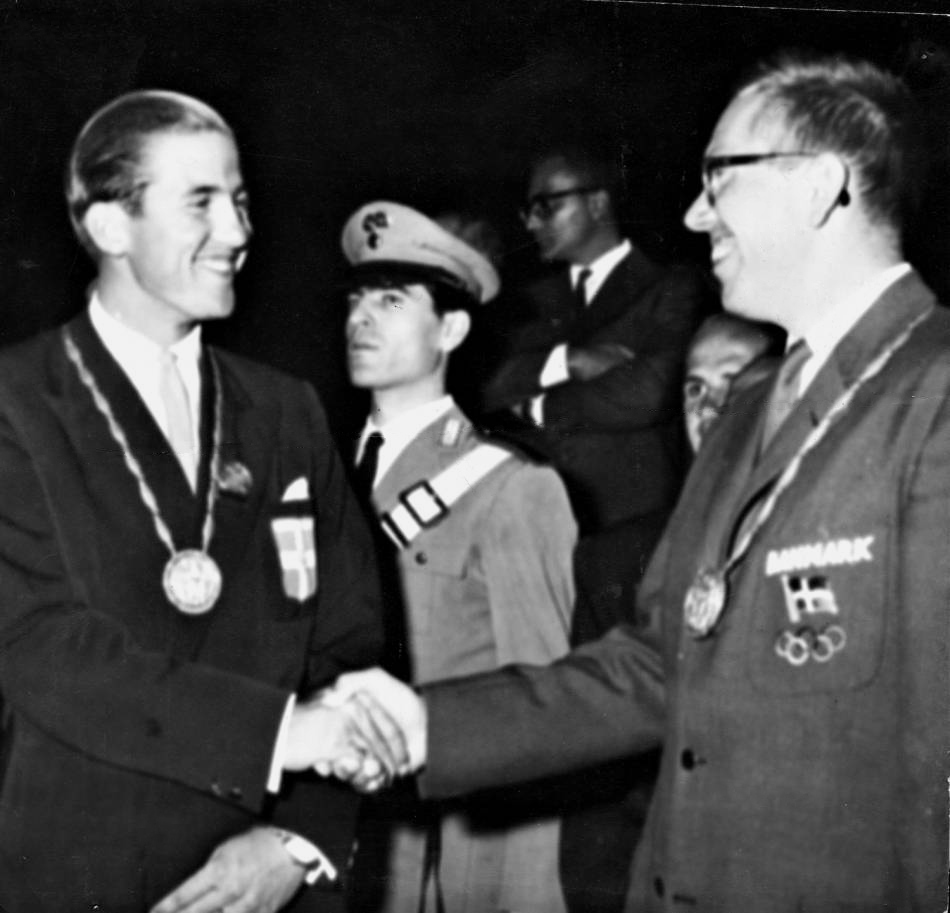
Gold medalist and Crown Prince Constantine

- Crown Prince Constantine II of Greece and his two teammates won a gold medal in sailing at the Summer Olympics, competing at Naples in their yacht, the Nirefs. The future Greek King's elder sister, the future Queen Sofía of Spain, was on the sailing team as a reserve.
- U.S. President Dwight D. Eisenhower sought to improve relations with Panama and ordered that the flag of Panama would be flown next to the flag of the United States in the American-owned Canal Zone. The first Panamanian flag in the Zone would be raised on September 21 and was protested by members of Congress who felt that the flag raising was the first step in returning the territory to the Panamanians; flags would not be raised elsewhere until January 10, 1963.
- All 31 people on Aerolíneas Argentinas Flight 205 were killed when the DC-6 broke up over Uruguay during a heavy thunderstorm, and crashed on a ranch near the town of Dieciocho de Julio. The flight had departed from Asunción in Paraguay and was on its way to Buenos Aires when the propeller on its No. 3 engine came loose and struck the No. 4 engine.
- Protestant minister Norman Vincent Peale served as the head of The National Conference of Citizens for Religious Freedom, speaking for 150 Protestant clergymen in opposition to the election of John F. Kennedy, a Roman Catholic, as President of the United States.
- Died: Wilhelm Pieck, 84, President of East Germany since the nation's creation in 1949. The office was abolished following his death.

== September 8, 1960 (Thursday) ==
- The Richardson-Merrell pharmaceutical company submitted an application to the FDA for approval of selling thalidomide in the United States, which it intended to market under the name Kevadon, beginning on March 6, 1961.
- President Eisenhower formally dedicated Marshall Space Flight Center in Huntsville, Alabama. The MSFC had opened two months earlier on July 1.
- Born:
- Aimee Mann, singer-songwriter
- Stefano Casiraghi, Italian businessman, second husband of Princess Caroline of Monaco; in Como (killed in powerboat accident, 1990)
- Died:
  - Feroze Gandhi, 48, Indian politician, died of a heart attack, his second in two years, at the Willingdon Hospital in Delhi. Both his widow, Indira Gandhi and his son, Rajiv Gandhi, would serve as Prime Minister of India.
  - Oscar Pettiford, 37, jazz bassist, died from an illness similar to the polio virus

== September 9, 1960 (Friday) ==
- The new American Football League made its debut with eight teams, as the visiting Denver Broncos defeated the Boston Patriots, 13 to 10. After barely surviving during its first four seasons, the AFL would merge with the older National Football League in 1966, bringing all of its teams (and two expansion teams) in to the NFL in 1970.
- At the 1960 Summer Olympics, India's men's field hockey team was defeated for the first time ever in Olympic competition, as Nasir Ahmad gave Pakistan scored a goal for a 1–0 upset. Since 1928, India had not only won 30 games in a row, it had outscored its opponents 197 goals to 8, until meeting Pakistan in the finals.
- Born:
  - Bob Stoops, American football coach at the University of Oklahoma, known for coaching the Oklahoma Sooners to the NCAA national championship in the 2000 college football season; in Youngstown, Ohio
  - Hugh Grant, English film actor; in Hammersmith, London
- Died:
  - Jussi Björling, 49, Swedish operatic tenor, died of cardiomegaly.
  - Ralph G. Brooks, 62, Governor of Nebraska since 1959 and the Democratic nominee for the November election for U.S. Senator A few hours earlier, Brooks, who had been hospitalized since late August for congestive heart failure, had been asked if he intended to withdraw his name from the ballot because of his illness, and issued the statement "I am sticking in the fight."

== September 10, 1960 (Saturday) ==
- In the U.S. Air Force exercise Operation Sky Shield I, the entire airspace of the United States and Canada was cleared of civilian planes from 1:00 to 7:00 in the morning to allow a simulation of Russian attacks. An estimated 1,000 U.S. commercial flights – carrying around 37,000 passengers – and 700 general aviation aircraft were affected by this exercise. To comply with this, Canada had 310 flights with 3,000 passengers affected, and 31 foreign flights scheduled to land in North America were canceled. The operation included 1,129 fighter scrambles which were flown by approximately 360 interceptors against the Strategic Air Command (SAC) strike force of Boeing B-47 Stratojets and Boeing B-52 Stratofortresses, which simulated an "enemy" (Soviet) force of 310 bombers.
- In a game against the Detroit Tigers, Mickey Mantle of the New York Yankees hit a home run over the roof and out of Tiger Stadium. The distance was not measured until June 22, 1985, when it was determined to have been a record at 643 feet (196 m), surpassing Mantle's 1953 hit of 565 feet (172 m) at Washington. Some observers doubt the measure, concluding that "it is impossible to hit a baseball that distance".
- Abebe Bikila of Ethiopia won the Olympic marathon, setting a world record (2 hours, 15 minutes, 16.2 seconds) and running the entire 26 miles and 385 yards (42.195 km) while barefoot, becoming the first person from Sub-Saharan Africa to win an Olympic gold medal.
- ITV inaugurated regular television broadcasts of English professional soccer football matches, starting with the telecast of a Football League First Division match between Blackpool and visiting Bolton Wanderers. The Wanderers won the match, 1–0.
- Yugoslavia defeated Denmark to win the gold medal at the Olympic soccer football finals, 3 to 1.
- Color television broadcasting began in Japan.
- Born: Margaret Ferrier, Scottish politician and MP suspended from the British House of Commons in 2020 for violating the UK's COVID-19 regulations; in Glasgow
- Died:
  - Edith Nourse Rogers, 79, U.S. Representative from Massachusetts since 1925
  - Sir Harold Gillies, 78, New Zealand physician and pioneer in plastic surgery

== September 11, 1960 (Sunday) ==
- U.S. Senators James Eastland and Thomas J. Dodd accused the U.S. State Department of complicity in Fidel Castro's invasion of Cuba.
- The Act of Bogotá was adopted by an 18–1 vote at the Inter-American Conference on Economic Aid.
- The 1960 Summer Olympics closed in Rome.

== September 12, 1960 (Monday) ==
- Against the advice of his campaign staff, presidential candidate John F. Kennedy had accepted an invitation to speak to Protestant ministers in Houston on the question of whether a Roman Catholic President could operate independently of the Vatican. In a famous address, Kennedy won over his audience, commenting, "I am not the Catholic candidate for President. I am the Democratic Party's candidate for president who happens also to be a Catholic." The next day, the Houston ministers described the address as "the most complete, unequivocal and reassuring statement which could be expected of any person in his position". Kennedy's opponent, Richard M. Nixon, a Quaker, commented that he could conceive of no circumstances which might ever require either himself or Kennedy to have a conflict between religion and the presidency.

== September 13, 1960 (Tuesday) ==
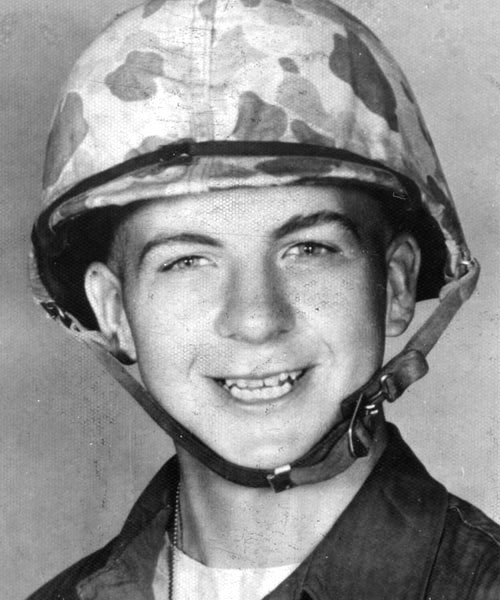
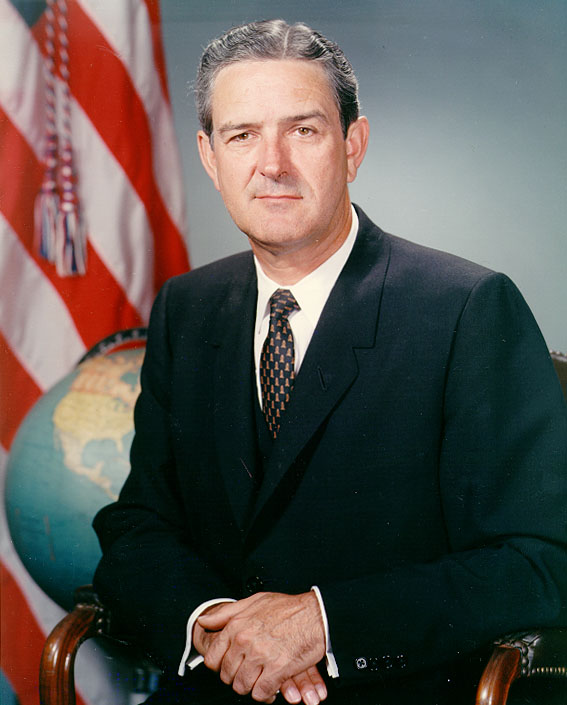
PFC Oswald and SecNav Connally
- Lee Harvey Oswald's honorable discharge from the United States Marines, granted on September 11, 1959, was revised to an "undesirable discharge" (rather than a bad conduct discharge or a dishonorable discharge, which require a court martial), based on bringing "discredit to the Marine Corps through adverse newspaper publicity" since defecting to the Soviet Union. Although William B. Franke was the United States Secretary of the Navy at the time the revision was ordered, Oswald would not learn of the action until 1961, when John Connally was appointed to the position by President John F. Kennedy, and would write to Connally several times to seek a reversal. Connally would later win the office of Governor of Texas, and on November 22, 1963, Oswald would shoot both Kennedy and Connally. At least one author, James Reston Jr., would theorize, 50 years after the assassination that Oswald was actually trying to kill Governor Connally, who had become the Governor of Texas by 1963, rather than President Kennedy.
- A total eclipse of the Moon took place and was visible in much of the Pacific Ocean. Astronomer William M. Sinton used the opportunity to make infrared pyrometric scans of the temperature of the lunar surface. Sinton confirmed findings, made by Richard W. Shorthill during the eclipse of March 13, that the Tycho crater had a significantly higher temperature than the area around it.
- Born: Kevin Carter, South African photojournalist and member of the Bang-Bang Club; in Johannesburg (committed suicide, 1994)

== September 14, 1960 (Wednesday) ==
- The Organization of Petroleum Exporting Countries, OPEC, was created at the conclusion of a conference in Baghdad between representatives from Iraq, Iran, Kuwait, Saudi Arabia and Venezuela.

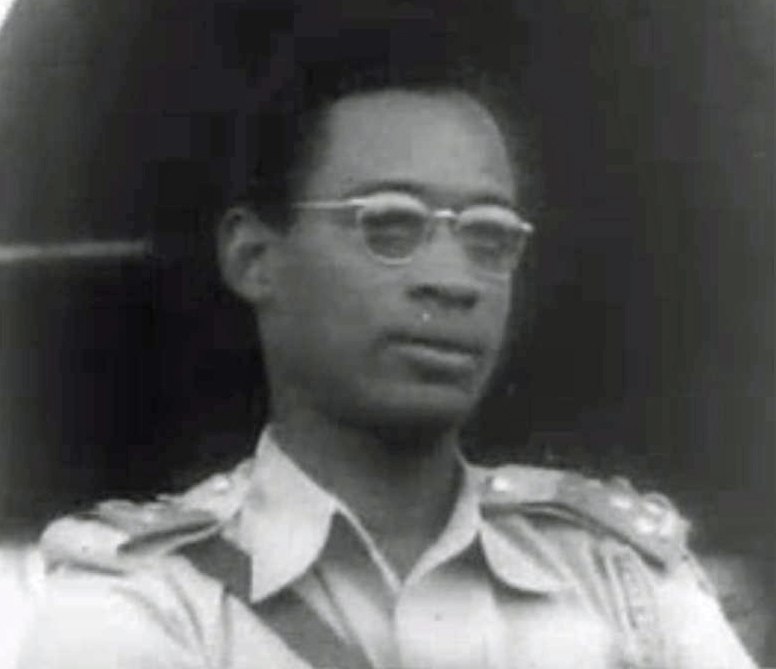
Joseph Mobutu, Army Chief of Staff, later Mobutu Sese Seko

- In the Congo, Colonel Joseph Mobutu, the 30-year-old Army Chief of Staff, staged a military coup, while allowing Joseph Kasavubu to continue as president. Two days later, Mobutu gave the Soviet Union's forces 48 hours to depart.
- Rankin/Bass Productions, the studio known for their Christmas specials, was founded by Arthur Rankin Jr. and Jules Bass in New York City.

== September 15, 1960 (Thursday) ==
- Cuba nationalized its signature industry, seizing 16 cigar factories, 14 cigarette factories and 20 tobacco warehouses. Those manufacturers who could depart got a new start in other nations, and the famed "fine Cuban cigars" were replaced by Dominican, Nicaraguan, Honduran and other cigars.
- Died: Héctor Castro, 55, disabled Uruguayan footballer who overcame the loss of an arm to help Uruguay win its first World Cup in 1930.

== September 16, 1960 (Friday) ==
- Amos Alonzo Stagg retired from coaching football after a career that had started in 1890, commenting that "For the past 70 years I have been a coach. At the age of 98 years, it seems a good time to stop." After two years at Springfield College, Stagg became the first head coach of the University of Chicago football team and remained there for 41 seasons. Forced to leave at age 70, he then guided College of the Pacific for 13 years. At age 85, he became an assistant to his son, the head coach at Susquehanna College, and then volunteered as an assistant at Stockton College in California.
- Joseph Kasavubu, President of the Republic of the Congo expelled two Communist ambassadors from the country.
- Two dogs, Pal'ma and Malek, were launched into space aboard an R-2 rocket by the USSR.

== September 17, 1960 (Saturday) ==
- The ABC television network in the U.S. broadcast its first regular season college football game, with numerous television innovations that would become a standard. Producer Roone Arledge, whose stated goal was "to take the viewer to the game", hired director Andy Sidaris in introducing a "sideline reporter" (Bob Neal), handheld cameras to show fans in the stands (including the brief "honey shot" of an attractive female spectator), and showing highlights and interviews on TV at halftime break. The initial broadcast was the Alabama Crimson Tide hosting the Georgia Bulldogs at Birmingham, in what would turn out to be a 21 to 6 upset by unranked Alabama over 13th ranked Georgia.
- U.S. President Eisenhower issued an order allowing the flag of Panama to be flown alongside the U.S. flag within the Panama Canal Zone, at the time an American territory, outside of a single building, the U.S. government building in Shaler Plaza, despite threats from U.S. Representative Daniel Flood of Pennsylvania to seek impeachment. Eisenhower's successor, John F. Kennedy, would go on to permit the Panamanian flag to be flown next to the U.S. flag at all government sites in the Zone.
- The government of Cuba ordered that the three United States banks be nationalized, in response to the suspension of U.S. financial credits to Cuban banks. The property and deposits of three U.S. banks, including First National City Bank of New York (now Citibank), with all banking functions being taken over by the Cuban-owned Banco Nacional de Cuba.
- Born:
  - Kevin Clash, American puppeteer, director and producer known for puppeteering Elmo on Sesame Street from 1985 to 2012; in Baltimore
  - Damon Hill, English racing driver; in Hampstead, London
- Died: John Brallier, 83, for many years believed to have been, in 1895, the very first professional American football player (although it was later determined that Pudge Heffelfinger had turned pro in 1892). Brailler's death came on the 40th anniversary of the founding of the National Football League.

== September 18, 1960 (Sunday) ==
- The first international Summer Paralympics opened in Rome. Although the term "paralympics" would be used starting in 1984, the event was initially held under the title "9th International Stoke Mandeville Games", which had been staged annually since 1948 in England in the village of Stoke Mandeville, Buckinghamshire, primarily for British athletes with spinal cord injuries. The 1960 games, the first quadrennial paralympic event outside of England, attracted 400 competitors from 23 nations, with eight events.
- In elections in Sweden, the Social Democrats, led by Prime Minister Tage Erlander, kept control of the Riksdag, winning 116 of the 232 seats.

== September 19, 1960 (Monday) ==
- Nikita Khrushchev and other Communist Bloc leaders arrived in the United States on the Soviet ocean liner Baltika, which docked at New York City at 9:20 a.m. Accompanied by János Kádár of Hungary, Todor Zhivkov of Bulgaria, and Gheorghe Gheorghiu-Dej of Romania, Khrushchev stepped off the ship to a mixture of cheers and boos, and then was driven to the Soviet consulate. Khrushchev and other leaders had arrived for the opening session of the United Nations General Assembly and could travel to New York at any time under the terms of the United Nations Treaty. Though the United States government could not bar Khrushchev, it asked television networks to minimize coverage of Khrushchev's visit, and restricted him from traveling outside of Manhattan and Long Island.
- The crash of World Airways Flight 830 killed 80 of the 94 people on board, when the DC-6B crashed three minutes after takeoff from the Agana airport in Guam. The plane had been chartered by the United States Air Force to take military personnel and their dependents from Clark Air Force Base (in the Philippines) back to the United States and had crashed into the side of Mt. Barrigada. The crash was the first in the 12-year history of World Airways.
- Pakistan and India signed the Indus Waters Treaty, agreeing to share the waters of the Indus River and its tributaries.
- Born:
  - Yolanda Saldívar, American former nurse who was convicted of the murder of Selena in 1995; in San Antonio, Texas
  - Mario Batali, American chef, writer, and former restaurateur; in Seattle, Washington

== September 20, 1960 (Tuesday) ==
- The opening of the new term of the United Nations General Assembly brought an unprecedented number of the world's leaders to New York City. The first ever meeting between Soviet leader Nikita Khrushchev and Cuba's Fidel Castro took place, not in Moscow or Havana, but at the Hotel Theresa in Harlem, where Castro and his entourage were staying during their visit. Fourteen new members were admitted to the U.N. They were Cyprus, along with the newly independent African nations of Dahomey, Upper Volta, Cameroon, Central African Republic, Chad, Republic of the Congo (Leopoldville), Republic of the Congo (Brazzaville), Côte d'Ivoire, Gabon, Madagascar, Niger, Somalia, Togo, bringing that body's membership to 98.
- The Atlas launch vehicle 67-D was delivered to Cape Canaveral for the Mercury-Atlas 2 reentry test mission.
- Died:
  - Dr. Ernest Goodpasture, 73, Vanderbilt University professor who, in 1931, invented the method of mass production of vaccines using fertilized chicken eggs, but never patented the process.
  - Ida Rubinstein, 74, Russian-born French ballerina

== September 21, 1960 (Wednesday) ==
- Dr. Albert Starr, along with Dr. Dwight Harken, performed the first successful implantation of an artificial mitral valve. They implanted the Starr-Edwards valve, designed by retired engineer Miles Edwards and Dr. Starr, into Philip Amundson, a 52-year-old farmer, in surgery at the University of Oregon. Amundson survived for ten years before dying in an accident.
- In the Malaya Federation, Tuanku Syed Putra, Sultan of Perlis was elected as the third Yang di-Pertuan Agong, the monarch and head of state of the federation. Putra's selection was required following the September 1 death of his predecessor, Sultan Hisamuddin Alam Shah, whom he served as the deputy monarch.
- The launch of a production Mercury spacecraft was aborted after a poor separation from the launch tower on Wallops Island. Controllers at the Langley Research Center began preparing tests of the jettison rockets. On the same day, the Mercury astronauts received weightless training in a modified C-135 jet aircraft, with weightlessness simulated for 30 seconds at a time. In earlier tests, an F-100 fighter bomber had allowed weightlessness for up to 50 seconds, and a C-131 for only 15 seconds. During the C-135 flights, the astronauts were checked for their ability to control the aircraft during the increased gravity load as preceding weightlessness, and for whether they could speak normally.
- Born: David James Elliott, Canadian television actor known for being the star of the TV series JAG; in Toronto

== September 22, 1960 (Thursday) ==
Senegal

Mali

Mali Federation

- The Federation of Mali, led by Modibo Keïta, acknowledged the withdrawal of Senegal a month earlier, withdrew from the French Community, and declared full independence from France as the Republic of Mali. September 22 is now celebrated as Mali's Independence Day.
- All 29 U.S. Marines on board a Douglas C-54 Skymaster were killed after takeoff from Atsugi NAS in Japan to NAS Cubi Point in the Philippines. An engine caught fire and the airplane exploded while diverting to Okinawa for an emergency landing, and plunged instead into the Pacific Ocean.
- Stanley William Fitzgerald, who had been placed on the FBI's Ten Most Wanted Fugitives only two days earlier, was arrested in Portland, Oregon, after a citizen recognized him from a photograph in a newspaper.
- Born:
  - Isaac Herzog, President of Israel since 2021 and son of former president Chaim Herzog; in Tel Aviv
  - Scott Baio, American TV and film actor and comedian, known for Charles in Charge (1984–1990) and Happy Days (1977–1984); in Brooklyn, New York City

== September 23, 1960 (Friday) ==
- In an address at the United Nations, Soviet leader Nikita Khrushchev surprised the gathered world leaders by calling for the Secretary-General to be replaced by a "troika", a three-member panel drawn from the Western nations, the Communist nations, and the non-aligned (Third World) nations. The proposal was never seriously considered.
- Born: Jason Alexander (stage name for Jay Scott Greenberg), American stand-up comedian and actor; in Newark, New Jersey

== September 24, 1960 (Saturday) ==
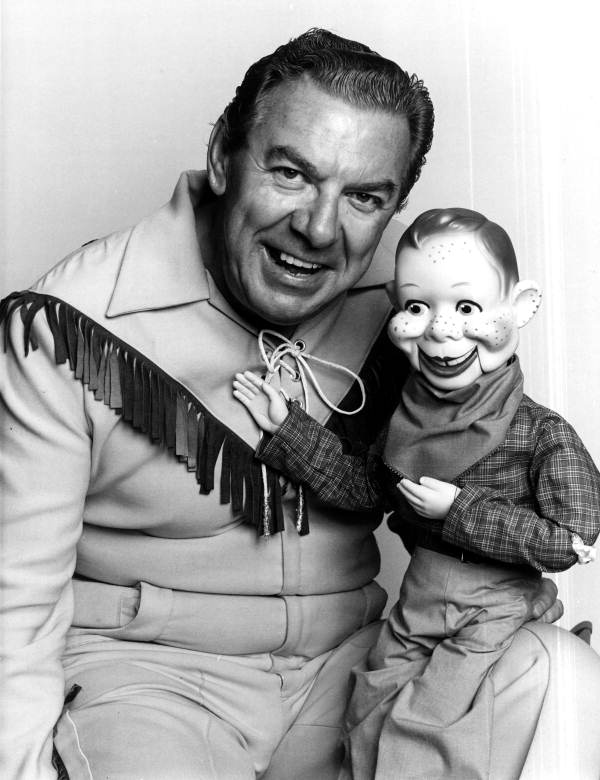
Final episode of the Howdy Doody Show aired in the U.S.

- The Howdy Doody Show presented its 2,343rd and final episode, after a run that started on NBC on December 27, 1947. After the marionette Howdy Doody, and host Buffalo Bob Smith, gave their farewells, Clarabell the Clown— who had used pantomime and honking horns to communicate, but had never spoken— surprised his audience by saying, "Goodbye, kids."
- USS Enterprise, the first atomic-powered aircraft carrier in history, and the largest ship ever built up to that time, was launched at Newport News, Virginia, after being christened by Mrs. William B. Franke, wife of the U.S. Secretary of the Navy.
- The Dallas Cowboys played their first NFL game, losing 35–28 to the team they later faced in three Super Bowls (1976, 1979 and 1996), the Pittsburgh Steelers.
- Died: Mátyás Seiber, 55, Hungarian composer was killed in an automobile accident in South Africa.

== September 25, 1960 (Sunday) ==
- In baseball, the New York Yankees clinched the American League pennant with a 4–3 win over the Boston Red Sox. The day before, the Pittsburgh Pirates won the National League pennant for the first time in 33 years, despite a 4–2 loss to Milwaukee, after the St. Louis Cardinals were eliminated by a 5–0 loss to the Chicago Cubs.
- Geothermal energy was used to generate electricity for the first time in the United States, as Pacific Gas and Electric Company placed a power unit online, drawing power from steam generated at The Geysers in northern California.
- Born: Ihor Belanov, Ukrainian footballer who played for the Soviet Union national team from 1985 to 1990; in Odessa, Ukrainian SSR, Soviet Union
- Died:
  - Emily Post, 87, American author best known for her works on etiquette
  - Ruth Rowland Nichols, 59, American aviation pioneer; by suicide

== September 26, 1960 (Monday) ==
- The first U.S. presidential debate in history took place as the two major candidates, Republican U.S. Vice President Richard M. Nixon and Democrat U.S. Senator John F. Kennedy faced each other in Chicago at the television studios of WBBM-TV. Carried live by all three networks, the debate began at 8:30 p.m. local time and lasted one hour. The first debate demonstrated the power of television in influencing voters. Kennedy appeared tan and charismatic, while Nixon, due in part to poor makeup and a recent hospitalization, looked unkempt and tense. A special act of Congress was passed in order to allow the American television and radio networks to broadcast the debate without having to provide equal time to other presidential candidates.
- The roll-out inspection of Atlas launch vehicle 77-D was conducted at Convair-Astronautics. This launch vehicle was allocated for the Mercury-Atlas 3 mission but was later canceled and Atlas booster 100-D was used instead.
- The crash of Austrian Airlines Flight 901 killed 31 of the 37 people on aboard, as it was making its approach to Moscow from Warsaw, after having originated in Vienna.

== September 27, 1960 (Tuesday) ==
- Mercury spacecraft No. 3, initially delivered to Langley on July 29, 1959, for a noise and vibration test, was erected at the Wallops Island launch site for Little Joe 5.
- Mexico nationalized its electric industry, with the Comision Federal de Electricidad buying out the three existing private companies.
- Died: Sylvia Pankhurst, 78, English suffragette leader

== September 28, 1960 (Wednesday) ==
- In Cuba, Fidel Castro created the "CDRs"—"Comites para la Defensa de la Revolucion" ("Committees for the Defense of the Revolution")—with volunteers reporting to the government about any counterrevolutionary behavior by their neighbors. Officially, there were more than 100,000 CDRs and 88% of the adult Cuban population were members in 1996.
- Ted Williams of the Boston Red Sox retired from major league baseball, playing in Boston against the Baltimore Orioles. In his very last at bat, Williams closed his career with his 521st home run and a 5–4 win.
- Born: Jennifer Rush, American singer known for her 1984 single "The Power of Love"; as Heidi Stern in Queens, New York
- Died: Elivera M. Doud, 92, mother of First Lady Mamie Eisenhower and mother-in-law of incumbent U.S. President Dwight D. Eisenhower

== September 29, 1960 (Thursday) ==
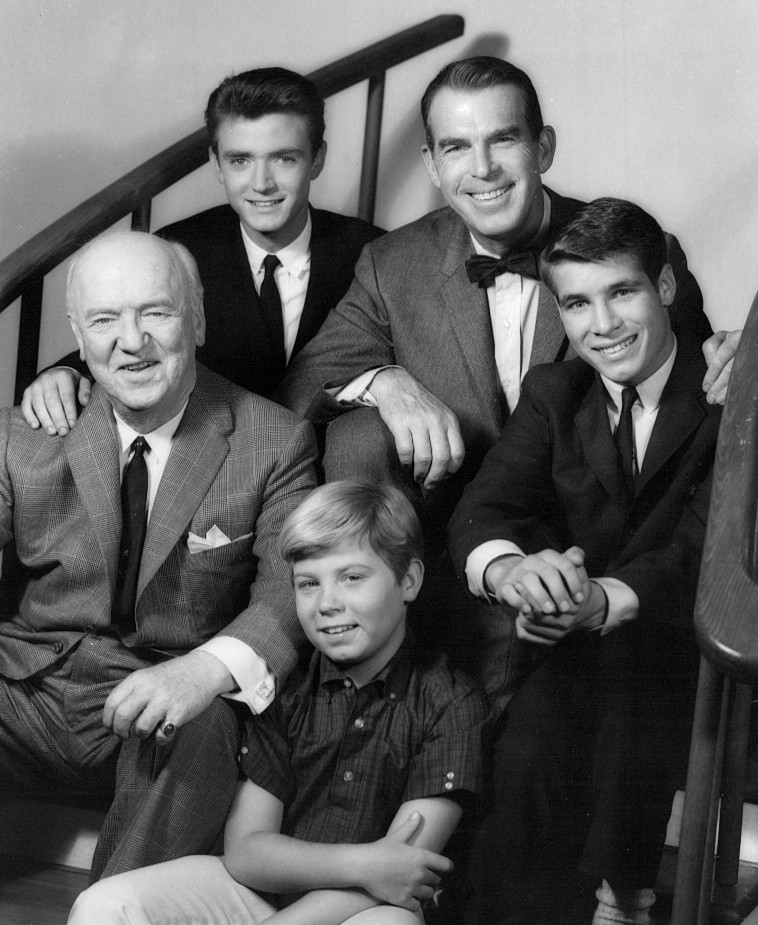
The original My Three Sons

- My Three Sons made its television debut, with veteran film actor Fred MacMurray as the widowed father, Steve Douglas, and William Frawley (formerly Fred Mertz of I Love Lucy) as the boys' grandfather, "Bub" O'Casey. The series would air from 1960 to 1965 on ABC and from 1965 to 1972 on CBS, with numerous cast changes.
- At the United Nations General Assembly, Soviet leader Nikita Khrushchev angrily interrupted British Prime Minister Harold Macmillan. Ever the gentleman, Macmillan calmly waited for Khrushchev to finish the harangue in Russian, smiled and commented, "I should like that to be translated", then finished his address.
- United Arab Airlines Flight 738 crashed in the Tyrrhenian Sea off of the coast of Italy while on a flight from Geneva to Cairo, killing all 21 people aboard, including Mahmoud Harbi, 39, a nationalist seeking the independence of French Somalia, now Djibouti.

== September 30, 1960 (Friday) ==
- At 8:30 p.m. EST, television viewers in the U.S. were invited to meet The Flintstones, "a modern Stone Age family", with the premiere of the cartoon as a prime time series on ABC.
- Mercury spacecraft No. 5, to be used for the launch of Mercury-Redstone 2 "Ham" into space, the chimpanzee was delivered to Marshall Space Flight Center for booster compatibility checks. After 11 days of testing, it would be shipped to Cape Canaveral on October 11.
- Born:
  - Vincent Waller, American writer, storyboard artist, animator, and technical director; in Arlington, Texas
  - Blanche Lincoln, U.S. Senator for Arkansas from 1999 to 2011; in Helena, Arkansas
- Died:
  - James Squillante, 42, a New York City mobster who controlled local garbage collection, was last seen alive by a witness. Squillante had vanished from public view on September 23, and was presumed to have been murdered by a rival.
  - Harry St John Philby, 75, British intelligence officer who converted to Islam in 1930 and became a Saudi Arabian citizen and political adviser.
