= October 1960 =

Month of 1960

<<	October 1960					>>
Su	Mo	Tu	We	Th	Fr	Sa
						1
2	3	4	5	6	7	8
9	10	11	12	13	14	15
16	17	18	19	20	21	22
23	24	25	26	27	28	29
30	31

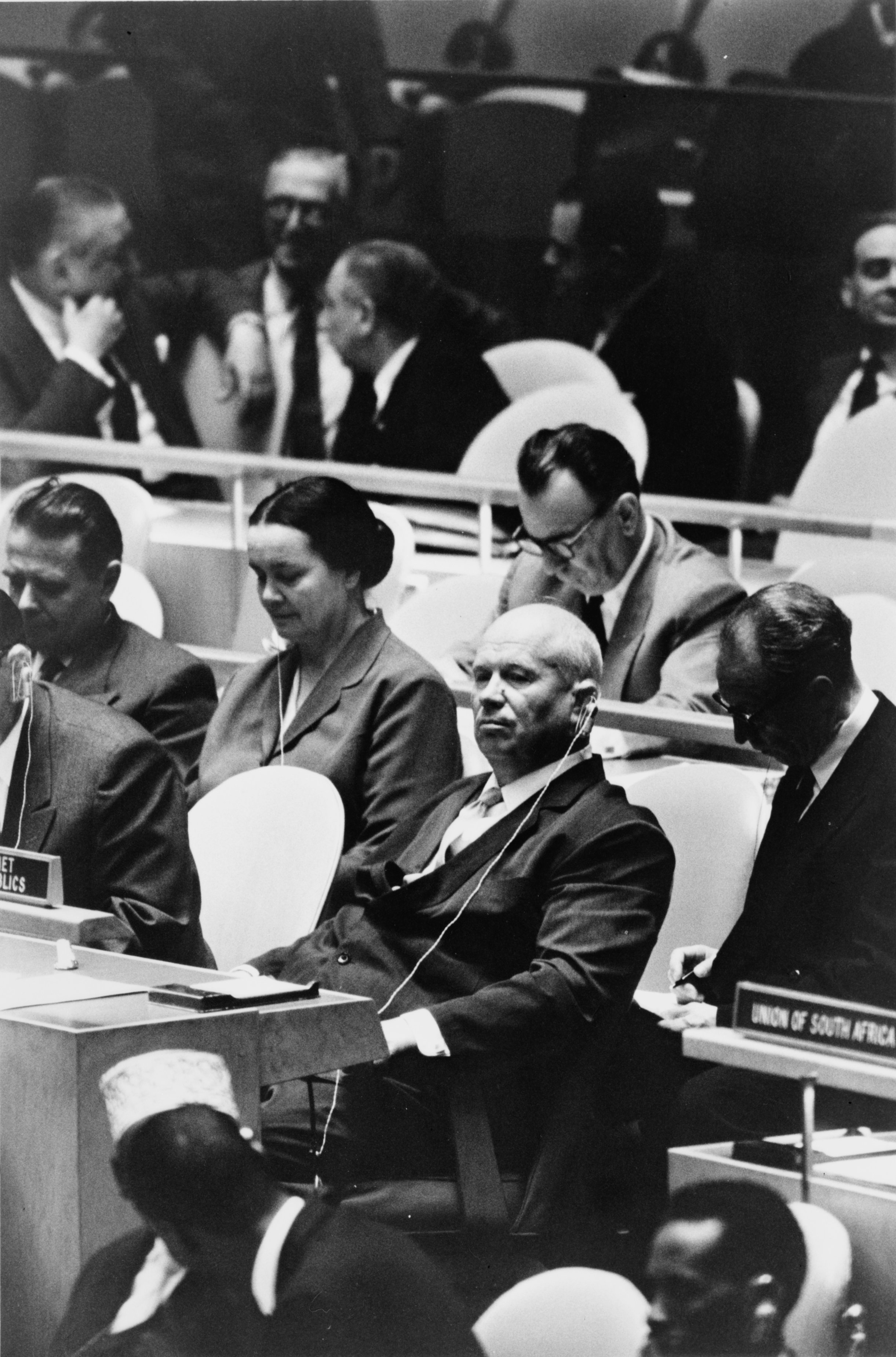
October 12, 1960: Soviet leader Khrushchev uses his shoe as a gavel

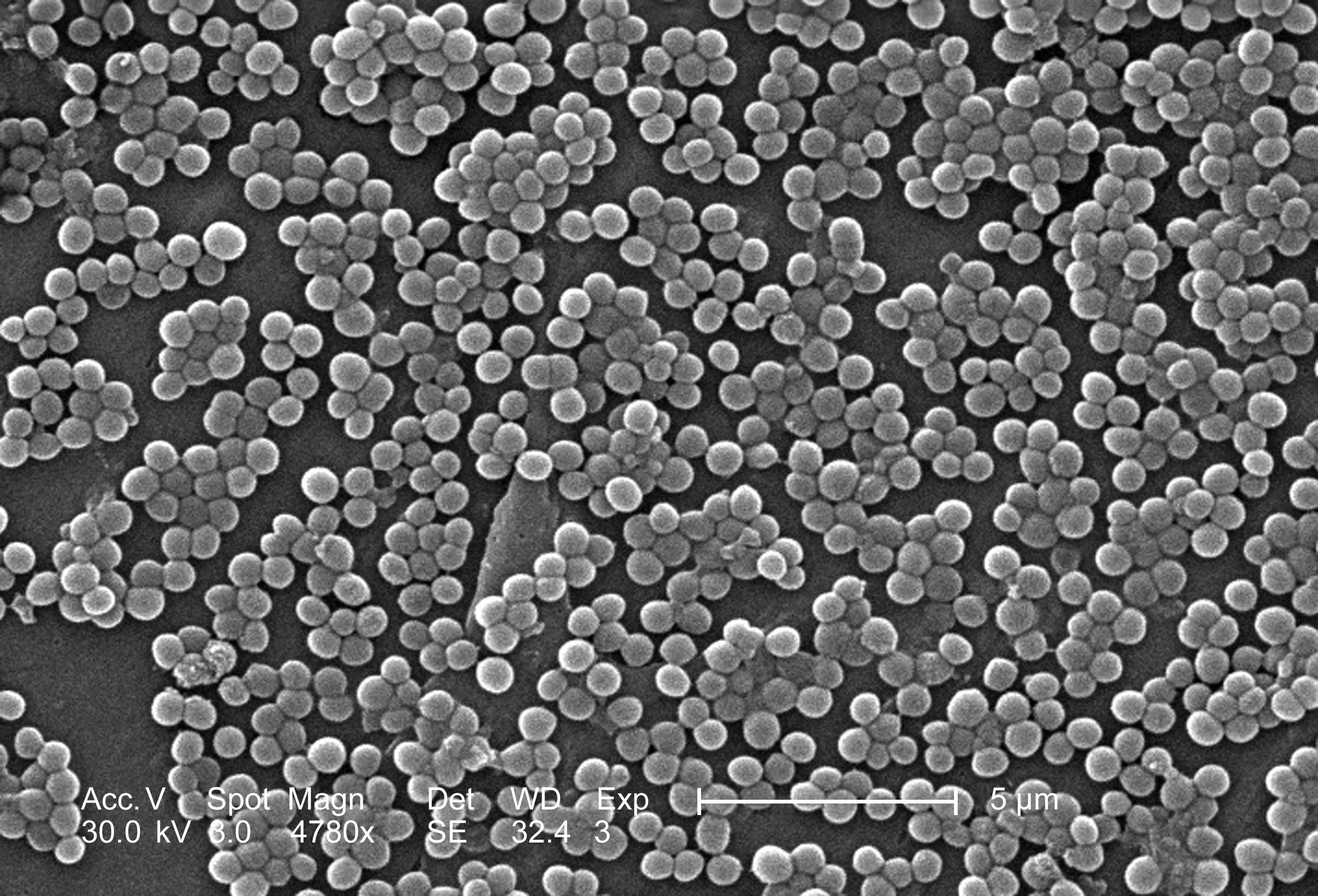
October 2, 1960: Antibiotic resistant MRSA discovered

October 1, 1960: Federation of Nigeria granted independence

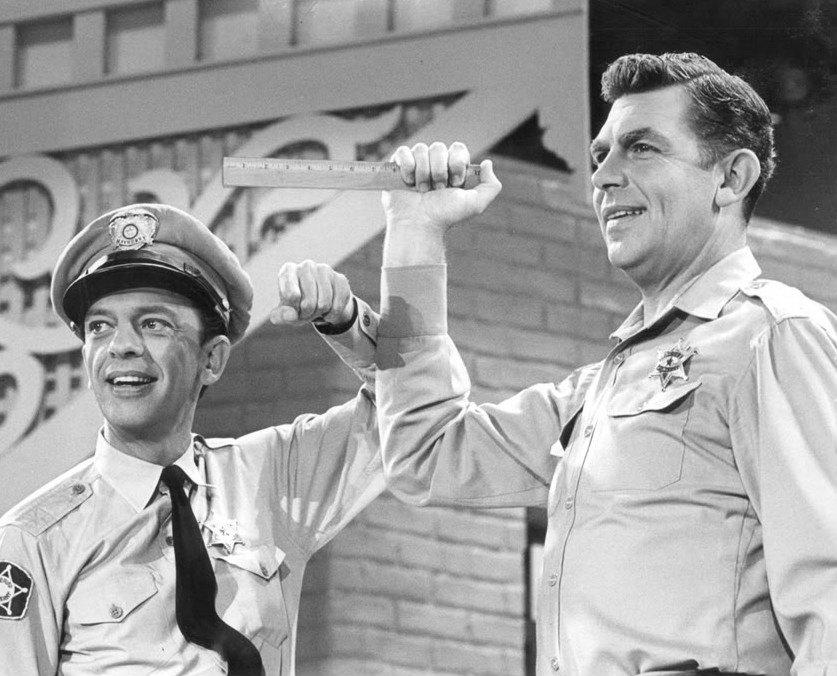
October 3, 1960: The Andy Griffith Show debuts

The following events occurred in October 1960:

== October 1, 1960 (Saturday) ==
- Nigeria, formerly a British African colony, became an independent nation of 35,000,000 people, with the new flag hoisted in Lagos at 12:01 a.m. Sir Abubakar Tafawa Balewa became the first Prime Minister, and Nnamdi Azikiwe the Governor General, of the Federation of Nigeria. In 1963, Nigeria became a republic, with Nnamdi Azikwe as its first President.
- The Lerner and Loewe musical Camelot, with Julie Andrews, Richard Burton and Robert Goulet, opened at the O'Keefe Centre in Toronto, where it was given a test run and found to be too long, running well past midnight. After several numbers were cut, Camelot made its Broadway debut on December 3.
- Argentina launched its third television network, El Trece, as Canal 13 began broadcasting.

== October 2, 1960 (Sunday) ==
- Methicillin-resistant Staphylococcus aureus, the antibiotic-resistant form of bacteria known as MRSA, was first isolated. Dr. M. Patricia Jevons, of the Staphylococcus Reference Laboratory in Colindale, London, found the resistant form in six of 5,440 strains supplied from hospitals in southeastern England. On October 2, "Patient A" had an infection following a nephrectomy, and on the same ward, "Nurse B" had an infected skin lesion. Her findings were published in the British Medical Journal as correspondence on January 14, 1961.
- The first of a series of five bombings by the "Sunday Bomber" took place in Times Square, New York City. Seven people were injured.
- Died: Claro M. Recto, 70, Filipino statesman; of a heart attack

== October 3, 1960 (Monday) ==
- Jânio Quadros was elected President of Brazil for a five-year term, defeating General Henrique Teixeira Lott and Adhemar de Barros.
- The Andy Griffith Show was televised for the first time, making its American debut on the CBS television network in the U.S. at 9:30 p.m. in the first of 249 episodes.
- Eighteen days of centrifuge training program began for the Mercury astronauts at the Aviation Medical Acceleration Laboratory, in preparation . This was considered the final major centrifuge training preparation for the first attempt to launch an American astronaut into space, Mercury 3.
- Born: Michel Godard, French jazz musician; in Héricourt

== October 4, 1960 (Tuesday) ==
- The crash of Eastern Air Lines Flight 375 killed 62 of the 72 people on board, crashing moments after a takeoff from Boston when a bird strike stopped three of its four engines. The Lockheed Electra turboprop encountered a flock of starlings as it departed for Philadelphia as part of a multi-stop flight with a final scheduled destination of Atlanta. The plane plunged into Winthrop Bay and then sank. FAA investigators theorized in April 1962 that the unique sound of the Electra's engines was similar to that made by crickets, which starlings sought for food.
- Courier 1B, the world's first "active repeater" communications satellite (designed to handle high-volume transmissions), was launched from Cape Canaveral. However, it failed after 17 days.
- In Kingsport, Tennessee, an explosion at the aniline plant at Eastman Chemical Company killed fifteen employees and injured more than 200.

== October 5, 1960 (Wednesday) ==
- In a referendum in South Africa, white South Africans voted to make the country a republic. The final result was 849,958 yes and 775,878 no, and Governor-General C. R. Swart would become the nation's first President on May 31, 1961.
- Born:
  - Daniel Baldwin, American actor and the second oldest of the four Baldwin brothers; in Massapequa, New York
  - Careca, Brazilian footballer; as Antônio de Oliveira Filho in Araraquara

== October 6, 1960 (Thursday) ==
- James Tidwell was admitted to the Cincinnati General Hospital in Cincinnati, Ohio, for treatment of cancer, and became the first of 88 unwitting victims of an experiment by the University of Cincinnati and the Atomic Support Agency of the United States Department of Defense. On October 28, he would be subjected to his first of many doses of ionizing radiation over his entire body, starting at 100 rads, and increasing gradually to 250 rads, and on November 7, doses of 300 rads to his brain. He would die on November 29, 1960, 32 days after treatment began, the first fatality of the program, which would continue until 1971. The existence of the experiments would not be revealed to the public until 1994.
- Spartacus, directed by Stanley Kubrick and starring Kirk Douglas in the title role, premiered at the DeMille Theatre in New York City before being released nationwide the next day. The film would become the highest money earner of the year.
- Died:
  - Caroline Grills, 72, Australian serial killer nicknamed "Auntie Thallie" because she was suspected of ten murders by thallium poisoning between 1947 and 1952; of peritonitis
  - Joseph N. Welch, 69, American lawyer who opposed Joe McCarthy during the Army-McCarthy Hearings

== October 7, 1960 (Friday) ==
- A Cuban Air Force fighter plane "buzzed" the USS Balao, a U.S. Navy submarine, in international waters. For 37 minutes, the Cuban "Sea Fury" fighter made low passes over the Balao. The U.S. State Department protested the next day.
- The Central Intelligence Agency prepared a box of poison cigars as one of several plans to assassinate Cuban dictator Fidel Castro. The cigars were delivered to a contact in Cuba on February 13, 1961, but were never used.
- U.S. presidential candidates Richard M. Nixon and John F. Kennedy had their second debate, which took place in Washington.
- Typhoon Kit killed 51 people in the Philippines. Typhoon Lola struck Luzon six days later, killing 26 more.
- The United Nations added its 99th member with the admission of newly independent Nigeria.
- The television show Route 66 began a four-year run on American television.

== October 8, 1960 (Saturday) ==
- The United Nations General Assembly voted 42–34 against admitting the People's Republic of China as a member, Red China's tenth straight rejection, but its most favorable vote to that time. China would finally be admitted in 1971.
- Bobby Richardson of the New York Yankees became the first player to hit a grand slam in a World Series, in a 10–0 win in Game 3 over the Pittsburgh Pirates.
- The Queen Fabiola Mountains, an Antarctic mountain group 30 miles (48 km) in length, were discovered, as part of the Belgian Antarctic Expedition.

== October 9, 1960 (Sunday) ==
- In the United States, the first National Historic Landmarks were created by the National Park Service. U.S. Secretary of the Interior Fred A. Seaton announced 92 properties as national landmarks. The first, the Sergeant Floyd Monument in Sioux City, Iowa, had actually been given the designation more than three months earlier, on June 30.
- Born: Madeleine Blaustein, transgender voice actress and comic writer known for her dubbing work on Meowth in the Pokémon series for its first eight seasons (d. 2008); in Long Island, New York
- Died:
  - Howard Glenn, 26, American pro football player for the New York Titans; after breaking his neck during a game against the Houston Oilers.
  - Khalifa bin Harub of Zanzibar, 81, Sultan of Zanzibar since 1911. He was succeeded by his eldest surviving son, Abdullah bin Khalifa.

== October 10, 1960 (Monday) ==
- The first Soviet Molniya rocket, bearing the first Earth probe of the planet Mars, was launched. However, control was lost five minutes into the flight. Another probe, launched four days later, failed as well.
- Comedians George Carlin, 23, and Jack Burns, 27, made their national television debut, appearing as the team Burns and Carlin, on The Tonight Show.

== October 11, 1960 (Tuesday) ==
- The Bugs Bunny Show debuted as a primetime half-hour program on ABC, featuring three theatrical Looney Tunes cartoons with new linking sequences produced by the Warner Bros. Cartoons staff. The show would run for nearly 40 years, ending on September 2, 2000.
- Senator Thomas J. Dodd called on Dr. Linus Pauling to name the scientists who helped him circulate a petition calling for a ban on nuclear weapons. Pauling declined to do so.
- At a U.N. meeting, Soviet leader Nikita Khrushchev warned that his country was manufacturing rockets on a large scale for potential use against the U.S.

== October 12, 1960 (Wednesday) ==
Assassination of Inejiro Asanuma

- Inejiro Asanuma, a 61-year-old Japanese politician and leader of the Japan Socialist Party, was assassinated by 17-year-old Otoya Yamaguchi, who stabbed the leader repeatedly with a wakizashi, a footlong sword.
- In a protest that would soon become famous, Baltimore housewife Madalyn Murray withdrew her 14-year-old son, William J. Murray, from Woodbourne Junior High School rather than continue participation in a daily Bible reading. Since 1905, the city school district had required Bible reading or prayer to open each school day. Mrs. Murray, later Madalyn Murray O'Hair, founded the American Atheists and continued challenging the relation of church and state. William would convert to Christianity in 1980.
- In a famous protest, Soviet leader Nikita Khrushchev removed his right shoe during a debate at the U.N. General Assembly, and pounded it on the table during a discussion of Soviet Union policy toward Eastern Europe. Khrushchev was angered by a remark by Philippine delegate Lorenzo Sumulong.
- A bomb explosion in Times Square subway station, New York City, injured 33 people. It was the third such bombing attack in eleven days.
- Born: Alexei Kudrin, Finance Minister of Russia from 2000 to 2011; in Dobele, Latvian SSR

== October 13, 1960 (Thursday) ==
- The third of the Kennedy-Nixon debates took place with the candidates separated by several thousand miles. Kennedy (in New York) and Nixon (in Los Angeles) were shown on television in a split screen. In order to avoid perspiring, Nixon arranged for air conditioning in the Hollywood studio.
- Three black mice were launched in an American rocket to an altitude of 700 miles (1,100 km), and recovered alive when the nose cone was recovered, becoming the first living creatures to survive a trip of that distance into outer space.
- The Pittsburgh Pirates won the 1960 World Series in Game 7, on a home run hit by Bill Mazeroski for a 10–9 victory over the New York Yankees. It was the first time in the history of the Series that a homer had won the championship.
- Died: Anthony Zarba, of Somerville, Massachusetts, became the first American to be executed in Cuba. Zarba and seven Cubans were shot by a firing squad in Santiago de Cuba after being convicted of an attempt to overthrow the Castro regime. Two other American members of the 27-man mercenary force, Allan D. Thompson, 36, of Queen City, Texas, and Robert O. Fuller, 25, of Miami, were shot on October 16.

== October 14, 1960 (Friday) ==
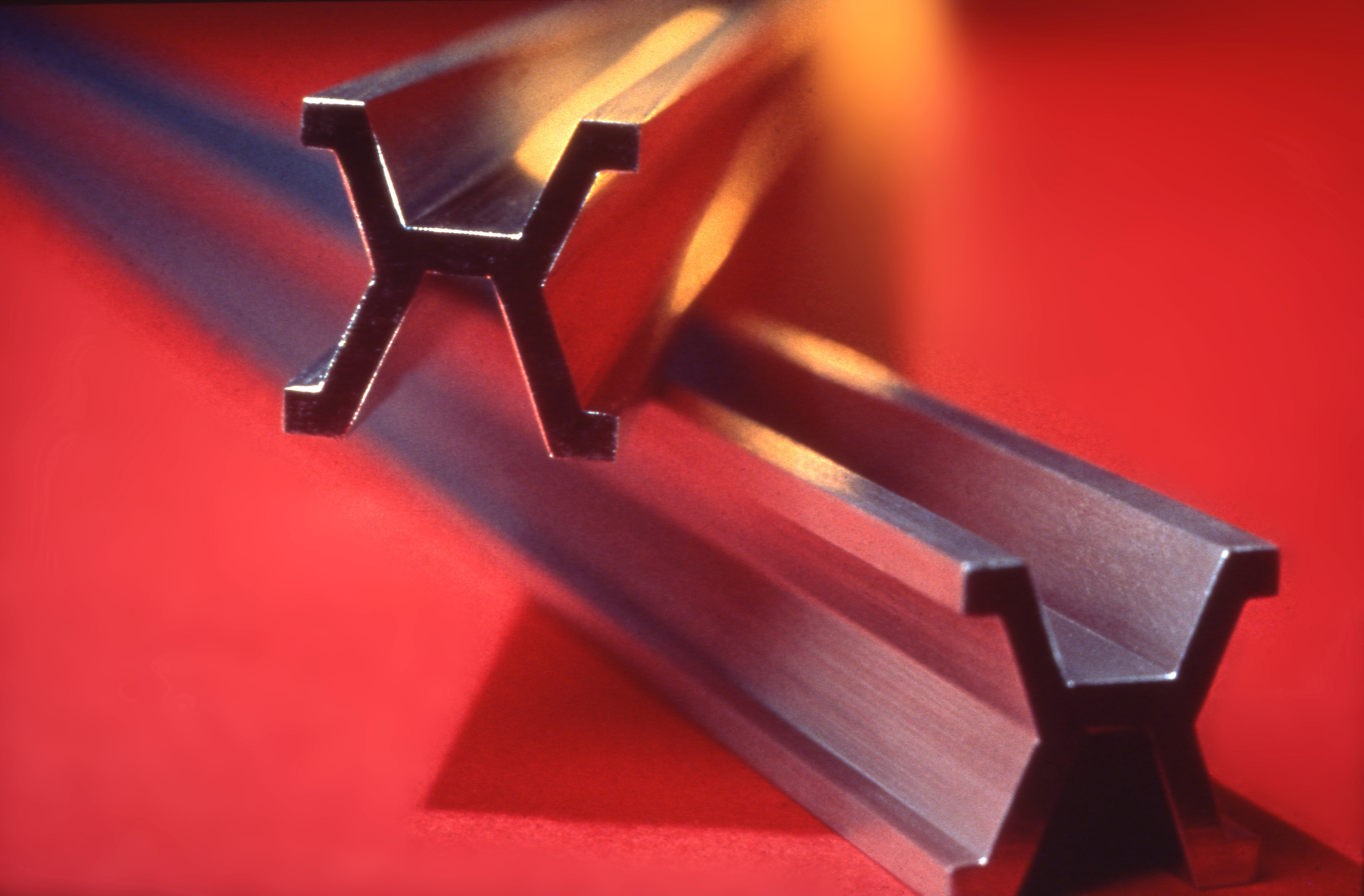
The Metre Bar, retired after 71 years

- The metre was redefined, by an act passed at the 11th General Conference on Weights and Measures. Replacing the platinum-iridium metre bar that had been kept in Paris since 1889, the new definition was 1,650,763.73 wavelengths of the orange-red line of Krypton-86. The definition was revised again in 1983 and 2002.
- Creation of The Lutheran Church in America was approved when 641 delegates of the United Lutheran Church in America (with 2,477,012 members) voted to merge with the Augustana Evangelical Lutheran Church (605,380), the Finnish Evangelical Lutheran Church of America (36,264), and the American Evangelical Lutheran Church (23,952). The vote, in Atlantic City, was 640–1, and the merger, approved earlier by the three smaller churches, took effect in 1963.
- Leaders of 17 nations assembled at the White House, as U.S. President Eisenhower hosted the heads of government of 15 newly independent African nations, and of Cyprus; the leaders of the sixteen newest members of the U.N.
- In a brief speech, made at 2:00 in the morning at the University of Michigan, U.S. presidential candidate John F. Kennedy first suggested the establishment of the Peace Corps.
- An antitrust lawsuit, ultimately unsuccessful, was brought by the American Football League against the National Football League.
- The Warragamba Dam, completed after 12 years, is opened by the Premier of New South Wales.

== October 15, 1960 (Saturday) ==
- Félix-Roland Moumié, a leader in the fight for the independence of French Cameroon, was poisoned with thallium by a French agent, and died on November 3.
- Died: Ya'akov Moshe Toledano, 80, Israeli politician and rabbi

== October 16, 1960 (Sunday) ==
- In the fiercest fighting in Algeria in two years, 277 Muslim Algerian fighters and 40 French soldiers were killed during weekend battles.
- Born: Guy LeBlanc, Canadian musician (d. 2015); in Moncton, New Brunswick
- Died: Arch McDonald, 59, American sports broadcaster

== October 17, 1960 (Monday) ==
- In Chicago, National League owners voted unanimously to expand from eight baseball teams to ten, with new franchises in Houston and New York for the 1962 season.
- More than 3,000 people died in East Pakistan (now Bangladesh) in a storm surge stirred up by a cyclone.
- A bus accident in Ecuador killed 35 people near Quito.
- A Project Mercury weather support group was established in the Office of Meteorological Research of the United States Weather Bureau at the request of NASA.
- The news magazine Jeune Afrique, now a weekly with a circulation of 500,000 worldwide, was founded in Tunis as Afrique Action.
- The Erie Railroad and the Delaware, Lackawanna and Western Railroad merged to form the Erie-Lackawanna Railroad.
- Born: Bernie Nolan, Irish actress, singer and television personality, formerly lead vocalist of the girl group the Nolans (d. 2013); in Dublin

== October 18, 1960 (Tuesday) ==
- Two American tourists, missing since a visit to the Soviet Union in August, were released unharmed and sent to Austria. Mark Kaminsky, 32, and Harvey Bennett, 26, had secretly been jailed in Ukraine and tried by a military court for espionage. After pleading guilty, both men were deported.
- The spacecraft checkout facility at Marshall Space Flight Center was transferred to Cape Canaveral.
- Born: Jean-Claude Van Damme, Belgian martial artist and action film star; in Berchem-Sainte-Agathe

== October 19, 1960 (Wednesday) ==
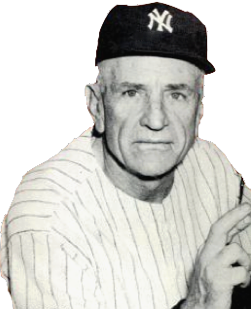
Stengel

- Casey Stengel, who had recently guided the New York Yankees to the American League pennant, was fired by the team because he was 70 years old. Stengel would soon be hired by the New York Mets as their first-ever manager.
- In Atlanta, Rev. Martin Luther King Jr. was arrested, along with 280 students, for taking part in a lunch counter sit-in at a Rich's department store. Charged with a parole violation from an earlier traffic violation, King was sentenced to four months of hard labor at the Reidsville State Prison, but released three days later after an appeal by Robert F. Kennedy, brother of Democratic presidential nominee John F. Kennedy, to Georgia Governor Ernest Vandiver.
- The United States announced an embargo on all American exports to Cuba, except for medicines and food. The embargo was tightened in 1962 and again in 1964 to restrict medical supplies and food.
- Riots took place in Caracas, the capital of Venezuela, following the arrest of three left-wing leaders.

== October 20, 1960 (Thursday) ==
- The price of gold rose sharply on the market in London, jumping by $3.00 per ounce after rises of 1 1/2, 8, and 26 1/2 cents in the first three days of the week. The price, which had been fixed by the United States at $35.20 per ounce since 1935, climbed past $40.00 on fears that the United States would devalue the dollar and that other nations' currencies would lose value as well. To avert a worldwide economic crisis, the United States Treasury increased its supply of gold to the Bank of England, and eight nations agreed not to buy gold for more than the fixed price.

== October 21, 1960 (Friday) ==
- HMS Dreadnought, the United Kingdom's first nuclear submarine, was launched at Barrow-in-Furness. A crowd of 11,000 gathered on Trafalgar Day to watch Queen Elizabeth II christen the sub.
- The Harrier jump jet made its first flight.
- Born: M. D. Valsamma, Indian athlete who was the second woman to win an individual gold medal in the Asian Games (for the 400m hurdles); in Ottathai, Kerala state

== October 22, 1960 (Saturday) ==
- The passenger ship Alcoa Corsair collided with the freighter Lorenzo Marcello near Buras, Louisiana, killing nine people and injuring 25.
- Henry Cabot Lodge Jr, the Republican vice presidential nominee, predicted that the Cold War could last until 1985.

== October 23, 1960 (Sunday) ==
- A woman in Milwaukee splashed Democratic candidate John F. Kennedy with whiskey while he was riding in an open convertible, then tossed the drinking glass into the car. According to an AP report, "Kennedy wiped his face, picked up the tumbler, said calmly 'here's your glass' and handed it back." No arrests were made. Kennedy would later be shot and killed while riding in an open convertible in Dallas on November 22, 1963.
- Born:
  - Donald and Ronald Harris, American professional wrestlers who became famous as the Harris Brothers; in Apopka, Florida
  - Randy Pausch, American computer scientist (d. 2008); in Baltimore, Maryland
  - Katoucha Niane, Guinean-born French model (d. 2008); in Conakry

== October 24, 1960 (Monday) ==
- In the Nedelin catastrophe, an R-16 ballistic missile exploded on the launch pad at the Soviet Union's Baikonur Cosmodrome space facility, killing over 100 observers, including Field Marshal Mitrofan Nedelin, who had ordered repairs to be made without allowing the fuel to be removed. The disaster was kept secret at the time, and not confirmed until 1989. Field Marshal Nedelin's death was reported at the time as having occurred in a plane crash.
- Fidel Castro's government confiscated most of the remaining valuable American-owned businesses in Cuba to retaliate for the United States' embargo on most exports to Cuba.
- Born:
  - Wolfgang Güllich, German rock climber; in Ludwigshafen, West Germany (killed in road accident, 1992)
  - Jaime Garzón, Colombian journalist; in Bogotá (murdered, 1999)
  - Ian Baker-Finch, Australian golfer; in Nambour, Queensland
  - BD Wong, American actor; in San Francisco

== October 25, 1960 (Tuesday) ==
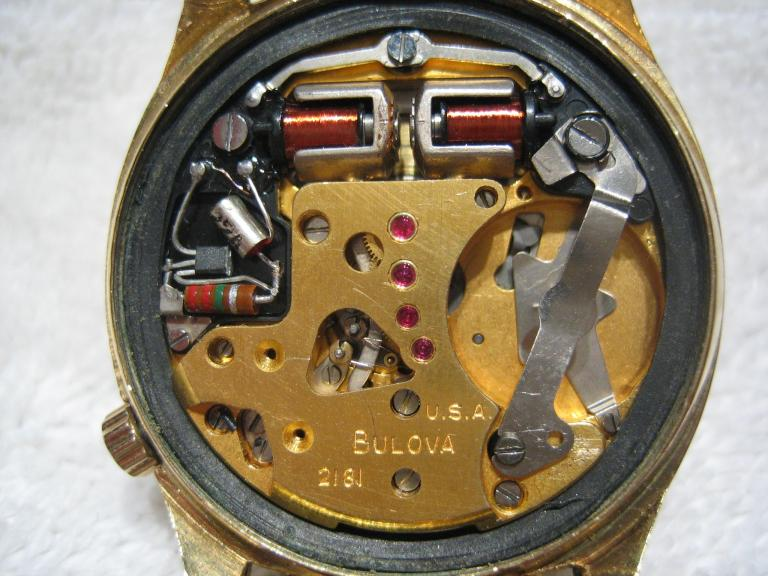
The Space Age wristwatch, Accutron 214

- The first fully electronic wristwatch, the Accutron 214, was unveiled by the Bulova Watch Company, along with the tiny watch battery to power it. Promoting the watch as the "First instrument of the space age you can wear and use!", Bulova added "It doesn't even tick ... it hums!" The watch itself went on sale in jewelry stores on November 24, 1960 with the least expensive, stainless steel model retailing for $175, equivalent to $1,480 in 2018 dollars.
- Two petroleum barges collided with a pillar of the Severn Railway Bridge in heavy fog, collapsing the bridge and killing five people.
- A gas explosion at the Metropolitan Department Store in Windsor, Ontario, killed 11 people and injured 25 others.
- The Kuala Lumpur British Royal Air Force base was officially handed over to the Malayan Air Force.

== October 26, 1960 (Wednesday) ==
- Baseball's American League voted to allow the Washington Senators to move to Minneapolis-St. Paul (as the Minnesota Twins) and to expand from eight teams to ten for the first time in the AL's 59-year history. A new team was placed in Washington (also called the Senators), and another on the west coast (as the Los Angeles Angels, now the Los Angeles Angels of Anaheim).
- José María Lemus, President of El Salvador, was overthrown in a bloodless coup, and replaced by a junta composed of three military men and three civilians. Col. Miguel Angel Castillo was joined by Col. César Yáñez Urias, Maj. Rubén Alonso Rosales, Dr. Fabio Castillo, and lawyers René Fortin Magaña and Ricardo Falla Cáceres.

== October 27, 1960 (Thursday) ==
- Madalyn Murray O'Hair (at the time, Madalyn Murray) and her son William, first attracted national attention, as her protest against Bible reading in the Baltimore public schools continued. She told the Associated Press that she was "prepared to fight the case to the Supreme Court". In 1963, the United States Supreme Court would agree with her that religious services in public school were unconstitutional.
- With less than two weeks left in the U.S. presidential campaign, eggs and tomatoes were thrown at Republican candidate Richard Nixon at various campaign stops in Michigan. At Muskegon, an egg struck Nixon's coat and hit a Secret Service man, while other items were thrown at Grand Rapids and at Jackson.
- The Food for Peace program was created by unanimous vote of the U.N. General Assembly, providing for nations with food surpluses to supply "the largest practicable quantities" to nations in need, "at low cost, payable in local currencies".

== October 28, 1960 (Friday) ==
- Three American surgeons from the University of Vermont became the first to describe a new development in medicine, microvascular surgery or, more commonly, microsurgery. In an address to the gathering of the American Heart Association in St. Louis, Dr. Julius H. Jacobson II, told how he and two colleagues, Dr. Ernesto L. Suarez and Dr. Donald B. Miller, had successfully used an otologist's operating microscope, normally used for ear surgery, to successfully reconnect small blood vessels within a dog. Dr. Jacobson would later be referred to among vascular surgeons as "the father of microsurgery".
- Alfred Frenzel, a member of West Germany's Bundestag since 1953, was arrested inside the parliament building in Bonn, and charged with espionage. While a member of the Defense Committee, Frenzel had also been spying for Czechoslovakia since 1955.
- Ali bin Abdullah Al Thani, Emir of Qatar since 1949, abdicated his throne in favor of his son, Ahmad bin Ali Al Thani.
- In Oslo, the Nobel Committee announced that there would be no Nobel Peace Prize awarded that year.
- Born: Landon Curt Noll, American mathematician; in Walnut Creek, California

== October 29, 1960 (Saturday) ==
- A plane carrying the California Polytechnic College football team crashed on takeoff from Toledo, Ohio, killing 24 of the 48 people on board. The Cal Poly team was on its way home to San Luis Obispo after a 50–6 loss to Bowling Green State University earlier in the day.
- In Louisville, Kentucky, Cassius Clay (later Muhammad Ali) made his professional boxing debut, defeating Tunney Hunsaker (a 30-year-old prizefighter who was also the police chief of Fayetteville, West Virginia) in a six-round bout.
- A coal mine explosion at Shiranuka, Japan, killed 17 miners.
- Born: Agim Çeku, 4th Prime Minister of Kosovo from 2006 to 2008; in Ćuška, Kosovo, Yugoslavia
- Died: Johan Gunnar Andersson, 86, Swedish archaeologist

== October 30, 1960 (Sunday) ==
- Nine days before Election Day in the United States, vice-president and Republican candidate Richard Nixon outraged President Dwight Eisenhower, at a White House luncheon, by pointedly refusing the President's offer to make campaign speeches in the final week. Eisenhower told RNC Chairman Len Hall, "Goddamnit, he looks like a loser to me."
- Michael Woodruff performed the first successful kidney transplantation in the United Kingdom, at the Edinburgh Royal Infirmary. Transplants had been performed in the United States and in France since 1954.
- Born: Diego Maradona, Argentinian footballer; in Buenos Aires (died of cardiac arrest, 2020)
- Died:
  - Alfred Hill, 90, Australian conductor and composer
  - Harry H. Goode, 51, American computer engineer

== October 31, 1960 (Monday) ==
- A cyclone killed at least 10,000 people in East Pakistan (now Bangladesh). The storm was more powerful than one that had struck the area two weeks earlier. The entire island of Kutubdia was submerged under 35 feet (11 m) of water, and the flooding killed thousands on the islands of Anwara, Bashkhali, Sandwip, Hatia and Ramgati.
- Born:
  - Reza Pahlavi, Crown Prince of Iran until the proclamation of the Islamic Republic in 1979; in Tehran
  - Luis Fortuño, Puerto Rican politician, Governor of Puerto Rico from 2009 to 2013; in San Juan
- Died:
  - Sewell Avery, 86, American businessman and President of Montgomery Ward retail stores from 1930 to 1954
  - H. L. Davis, 66, American novelist and winner of the Pulitzer Prize for the Novel in 1936 for Honey in the Horn
