= November 1960 =

Month of 1960

<<	November 1960					>>
Su	Mo	Tu	We	Th	Fr	Sa
		1	2	3	4	5
6	7	8	9	10	11	12
13	14	15	16	17	18	19
20	21	22	23	24	25	26
27	28	29	30

November 1, 1960: Belgium, Netherlands and Luxembourg create Benelux Economic Union

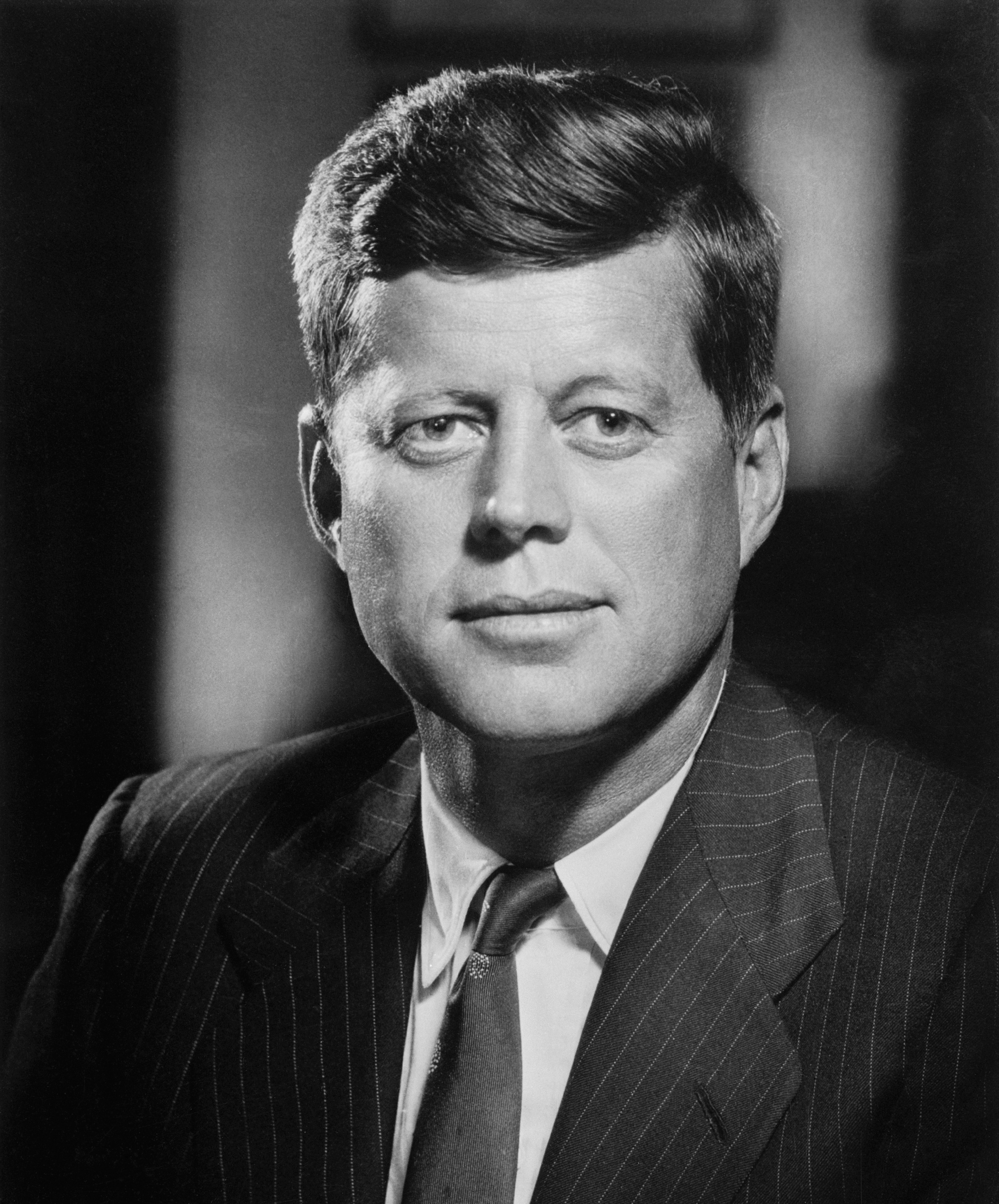
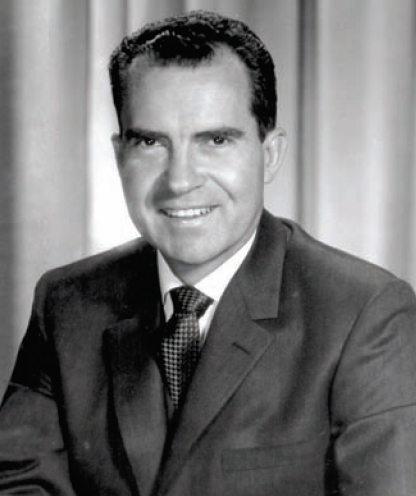
November 8, 1960: Kennedy defeats Nixon for U.S. President

November 28, 1960: Mauritania becomes independent

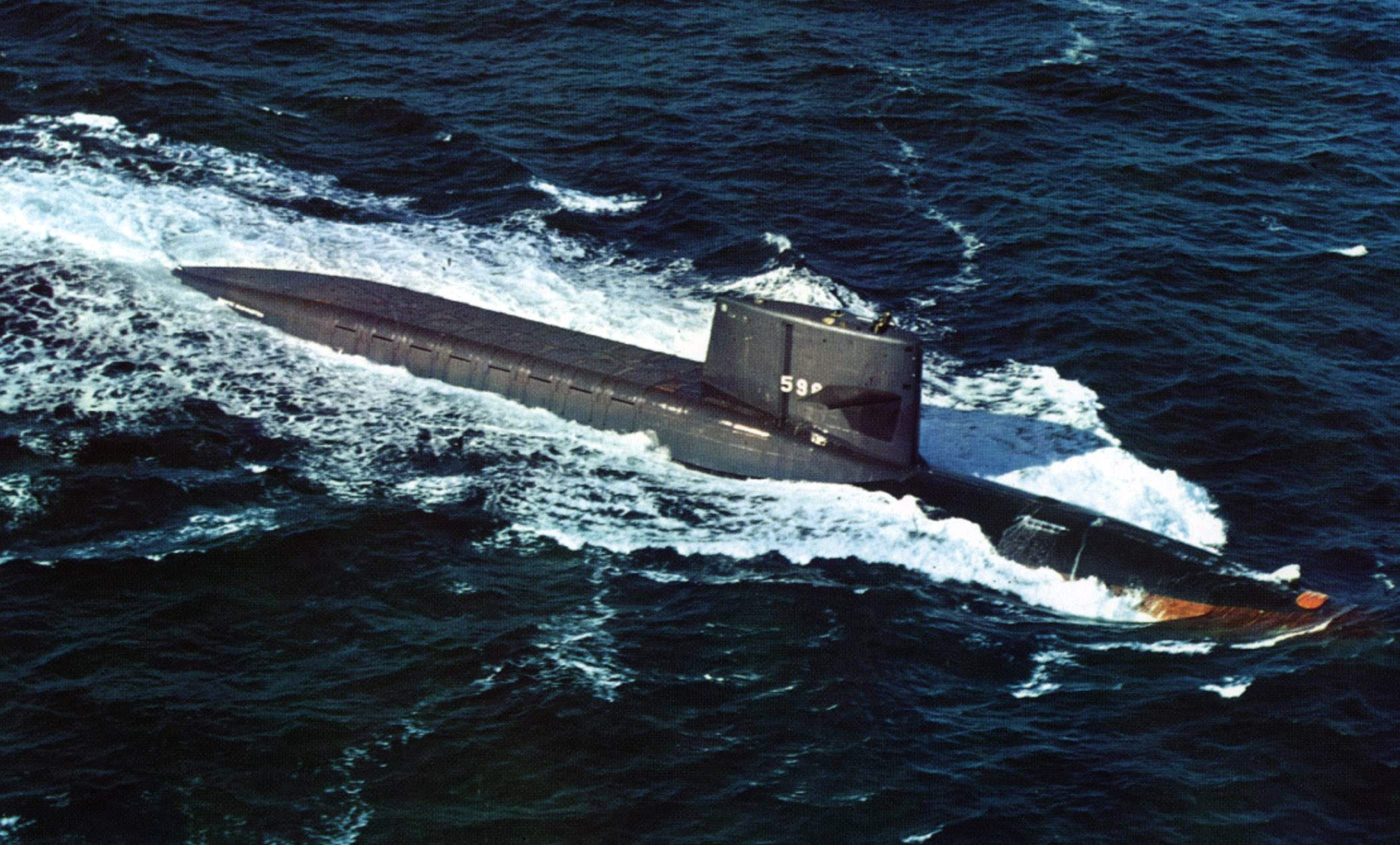
November 15, 1960: USS George Washington, first mobile nuclear base, departs Charleston with 16 missiles

The following events occurred in November 1960:

== November 1, 1960 (Tuesday) ==
- The Benelux Economic Union came into existence in accordance with the terms of a treaty signed by the three participating nations, Belgium, Netherlands and Luxembourg.
- U.S. President Dwight D. Eisenhower said that the United States would "take whatever steps are necessary" to defend the Guantanamo Naval Base in Cuba, "because of its importance to the defense of the entire hemisphere".
- Prime Minister Harold Macmillan of the United Kingdom announced that American nuclear submarines would be based at the Holy Loch, on the Firth of Clyde at Scotland.
- The Goddard Space Flight Center computing and communications center began operations, with two IBM 7090 computers, operating in parallel, to compute the smoothed exact position at all times of Project Mercury flights, to predict future spacecraft positions, and shift the coordinates to provide acquisition information for all observation sites. The importance of the Goddard computers would be graphically demonstrated when they predicted the amount of overshoot within seconds after landing during Scott Carpenter's Mercury-Atlas 7) mission on May 24, 1962. Goddard Center's action significantly reduced the time to find and recover the Carpenter.
- The recording by Elvis Presley of the song "Are You Lonesome Tonight?", originally written in 1926 by Roy Turk and Lou Handman, was released.
- The University of Kalyani was established, in Kalyani, West Bengal, India.
- Born:
  - Fernando Valenzuela, Mexican major league baseball player; in Navojoa, Sonora state (d. 2024)
  - Tim Cook, American businessman and current CEO of Apple Inc.; in Mobile, Alabama

== November 2, 1960 (Wednesday) ==
- In the case of R v Penguin Books Ltd, a jury in London concluded that Penguin Books had not broken Britain's Obscene Publications Act, clearing the way for the sale, in the United Kingdom, of 200,000 paperback copies of the book Lady Chatterley's Lover.
- The Unsinkable Molly Brown, a musical written by Meredith Willson, premiered on Broadway, opening at the Winter Garden Theater and running for 533 performances.
- Born: Anu Malik, Indian Bollywood film score composer; in Bombay (now Mumbai)
- Died:
  - Otoya Yamaguchi, 17, Japanese assassin, hanged himself in his jail cell three weeks after stabbing Inejirō Asanuma to death.
  - Dimitri Mitropoulos, 64, Greek pianist, conductor and composer died of a cerebral haemorrhage, after collapsing during a rehearsal

== November 3, 1960 (Thursday) ==
- Explorer 8 was launched to study the Earth's ionosphere. The satellite, which confirmed the existence of a helium layer in the upper atmosphere, stopped functioning later in the year but would remain in orbit for more than 50 years until returning into Earth's atmosphere on March 28, 2012.
- Died: Félix-Roland Moumié, 35, Cameroonian Marxist leader, was assassinated by a fatal dose of thallium, received earlier while he was visiting Geneva.

== November 4, 1960 (Friday) ==
- The Soviet news agency TASS was forced to deny that Soviet leader Nikita Khrushchev had been overthrown in a coup, after a rumor reported in a Vienna evening newspaper was repeated worldwide. The story began earlier in the day when a man, claiming to be an Austrian employee of the Soviet Embassy, told the Abend Presse that he had learned from an indiscreet Soviet employee that disgraced former leader Georgi Malenkov had replaced Khrushchev. The German-language paper then ran the banner headline, "Struggle For Power In Moscow: Khrushchev ousted, Malenkov Successor". Western newspapers repeated the news, usually with the caveat that it was unconfirmed, before TASS debunked it.
- As John F. Kennedy arrived at the Chicago Stadium for a pre-election rally, Jaime Cruz Alejandro forced his way through the crowd to get as close as he could to Kennedy's open convertible, then fought with police after running from them. He was found to be carrying a loaded .25 caliber pistol. Moments later, Reverend Israel Dabney was caught attempting to carry a .38 revolver into the coliseum. Both men said that they were carrying the weapons for self-defense and were later released.
- Filming of The Misfits, starring Clark Gable and Marilyn Monroe, was finished. It proved to be the last film for both legendary actors. Gable, who had performed many of his own stunts, had a heart attack the next day and died on November 16. Monroe would die in 1962 during the filming of the never completed Something's Got to Give.
- Anacafé, the Asociación Naacional del Café, was founded in Guatemala City to increase the world market share of coffee grown in Guatemala.

== November 5, 1960 (Saturday) ==
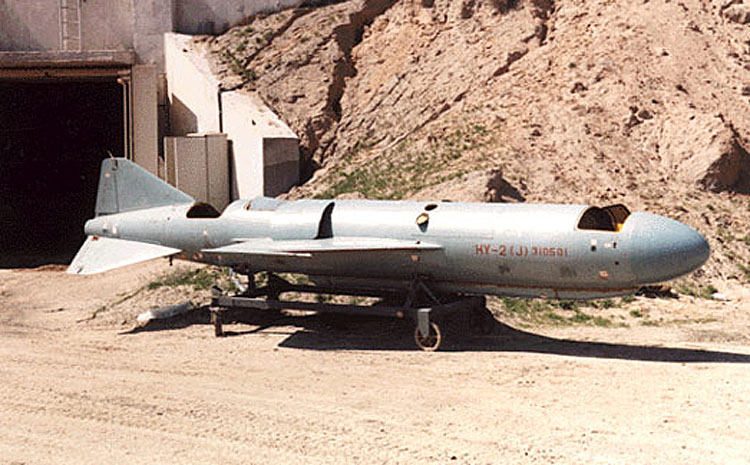
Silkworm missile

- The People's Republic of China successfully built and launched its first anti-ship cruise missile, basing it upon a Soviet weapon. The R-2, known popularly as the silkworm missile, had a range of 350 miles (560 km).
- Dorrence Darling II, a football player for Illinois State University, broke his leg during a game. Poor medical treatment led to an amputation, and "the Darling case" would become a benchmark in medical malpractice law, legally presuming a hospital to be responsible for the mistakes of physicians to whom it extended privileges.
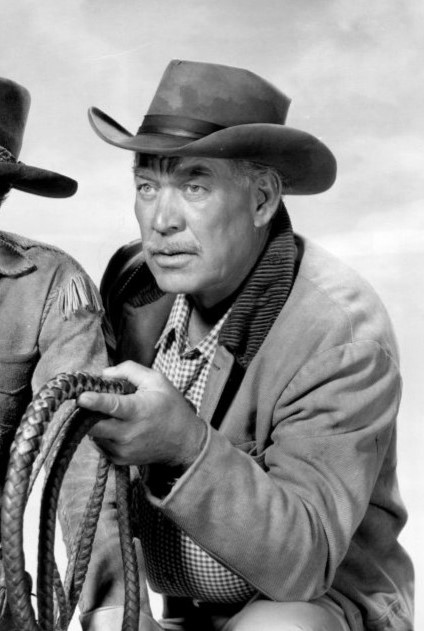
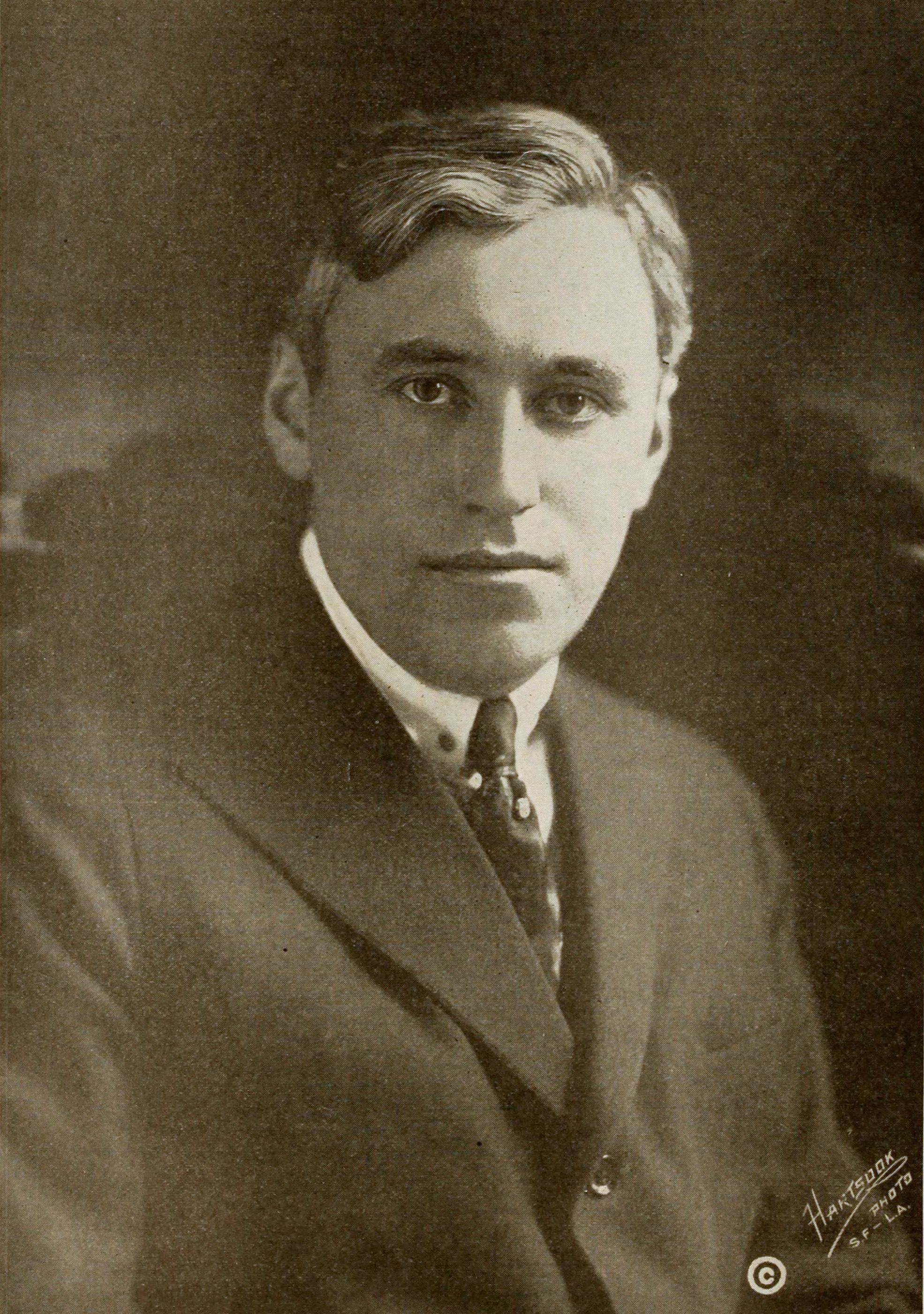
Ward Bond and Mack Sennett
- Died:
  - Ward Bond, 57, American TV actor and star of the western series Wagon Train, died of a heart attack while in Dallas, where he was scheduled to appear at the halftime show of an NFL game between the Cowboys and the Los Angeles Rams. His death came days after filming his ninth episode of the 1960–1961 season. His final show would be telecast on February 22, 1961.
  - Johnny Horton, 35, American country music singer known for "The Battle of New Orleans", was killed in an automobile accident when his car collided with a truck near Cameron, Texas
  - Mack Sennett, 80, American silent film actor, director and producer, known for the Keystone Cops
  - August Gailit, 69, Estonian novelist

== November 6, 1960 (Sunday) ==
- One person was killed and 18 injured by a bomb that had been placed inside a subway car in New York City. The bomb was the fifth to have exploded in New York City on a Sunday since October 2, and the first to have taken a life. The five bombings had injured a total of 58 people to that time, including the fatal injury to Sandra Breland, a 15-year-old Brooklyn resident.

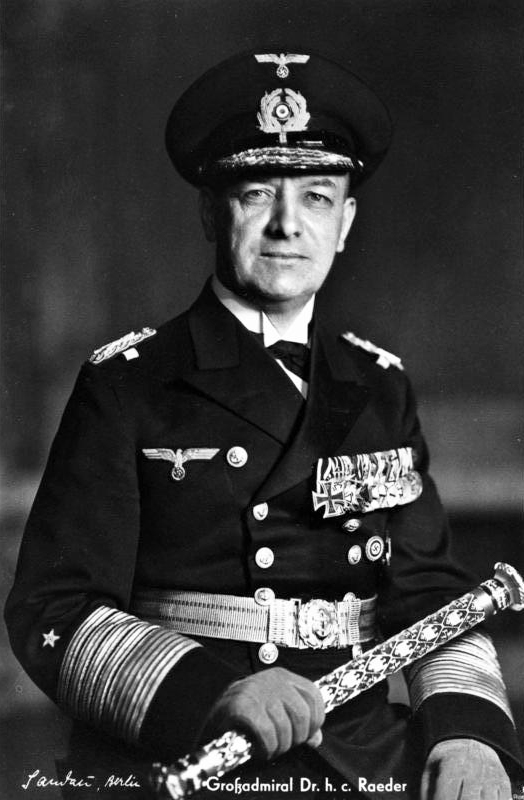
Raeder

- Died: Erich Raeder, 84, German naval commander during World War II

== November 7, 1960 (Monday) ==
- DFS Group, the first major network of duty-free stores, began operations with a shop at the airport in Hong Kong where luxury goods were sold to international travelers with the duty (normally collected upon arrival abroad by customs at the airport) pre-paid and forms filled out by the store. DFS Group now has locations around the world.
- In the worst plane crash in the history of Ecuador, all 37 people on a Companía Ecuatoriana Aérea (CEA) flight were killed when the Fairchild F-27 crashed into the side of the 14,623 foot high Atacazo volcano. The plane had been making an approach to Quito following takeoff from Guayaquil.
- A transit of Mercury (the planet Mercury passing directly between the Sun and the Earth) took place from 14:34 UTC to 19:12 UTC. The Sun-Mercury-Earth alignment happens 13 times in a century and had last taken place on May 5, 1957, and would not happen again until May 9, 1970.
- On the day before the U.S. presidential election, Republican candidate Richard M. Nixon appeared on the first telethon in the history of presidential campaigning. From 2:00 to 6:00 p.m. (EDT), on ABC, CBS and NBC, Nixon answered questions called in, by viewers, to a Detroit studio.
- Born: Santos Rodriguez, police shooting victim; in Dallas, Texas (killed, 1973)
- Died: A. P. Carter, 68, American gospel singer and father of June Carter Cash

== November 8, 1960 (Tuesday) ==
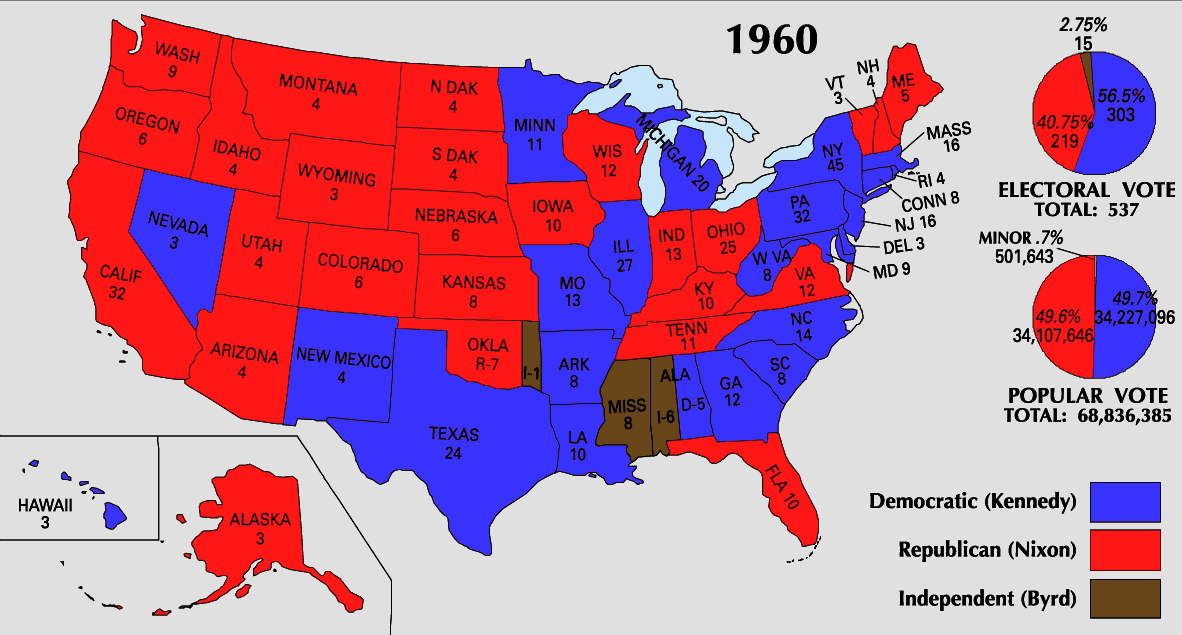
1960 Presidential election results map

- In the 1960 United States presidential election, a record number of American voters turned out to make their choice between Democratic candidate and U.S. Senator John F. Kennedy and Republican candidate and U.S. Vice President Richard M. Nixon. With 270 electoral votes needed to win, Kennedy received 303. The popular vote was the closest in history. Kennedy (34,220,984) won slightly more than Nixon (34,108,157) by a margin of 1/6 of one percent of the total votes cast.
- Little Joe 5, the first of the series with a McDonnell production Mercury spacecraft, was launched from Wallops Island to check the spacecraft in an abort simulating the most severe launch conditions. The launch was normal until 15.4 seconds after lift-off, at which time the escape rocket motor was prematurely ignited. The spacecraft did not detach from the launch vehicle until impact and was destroyed. Since the test objectives were not met, a repeat of the mission was planned.

== November 9, 1960 (Wednesday) ==
- The day after the American presidential election, Vice President Nixon conceded defeat to Senator Kennedy at 12:47 p.m. EST, 17 minutes after the news came that Kennedy had won Minnesota's 11 electoral votes. With 270 needed to win, victory in Minnesota took Kennedy to at least 272.
- Nicaragua was invaded by exiles who crossed over from Costa Rica and captured the border towns of Jinotepe and Diriamba. The United States Navy was directed to the area on November 17 and the rebels were defeated by December.
- Died:
  - Ernst Wilhelm Bohle, 57, German Nazi leader
  - Yoshii Isamu, 74, Japanese poet

== November 10, 1960 (Thursday) ==
- The uncensored, Penguin Books edition of Lady Chatterley's Lover went on sale in England and Wales, eight days after a London jury had concluded that it was not obscene, and became an instant bestseller.
- According to claims published later in the Fortean Times and attributed to Russian journalist Yaroslav Golovanov, "A cosmonaut called Byelokonyev died on board a spaceship in orbit." No evidence has been found to corroborate Golovanov's statement.
- Born: Neil Gaiman, British writer of short fiction, novels, comic books, audio theatre, and screenplays, in Portchester, Hampshire, England

== November 11, 1960 (Friday) ==
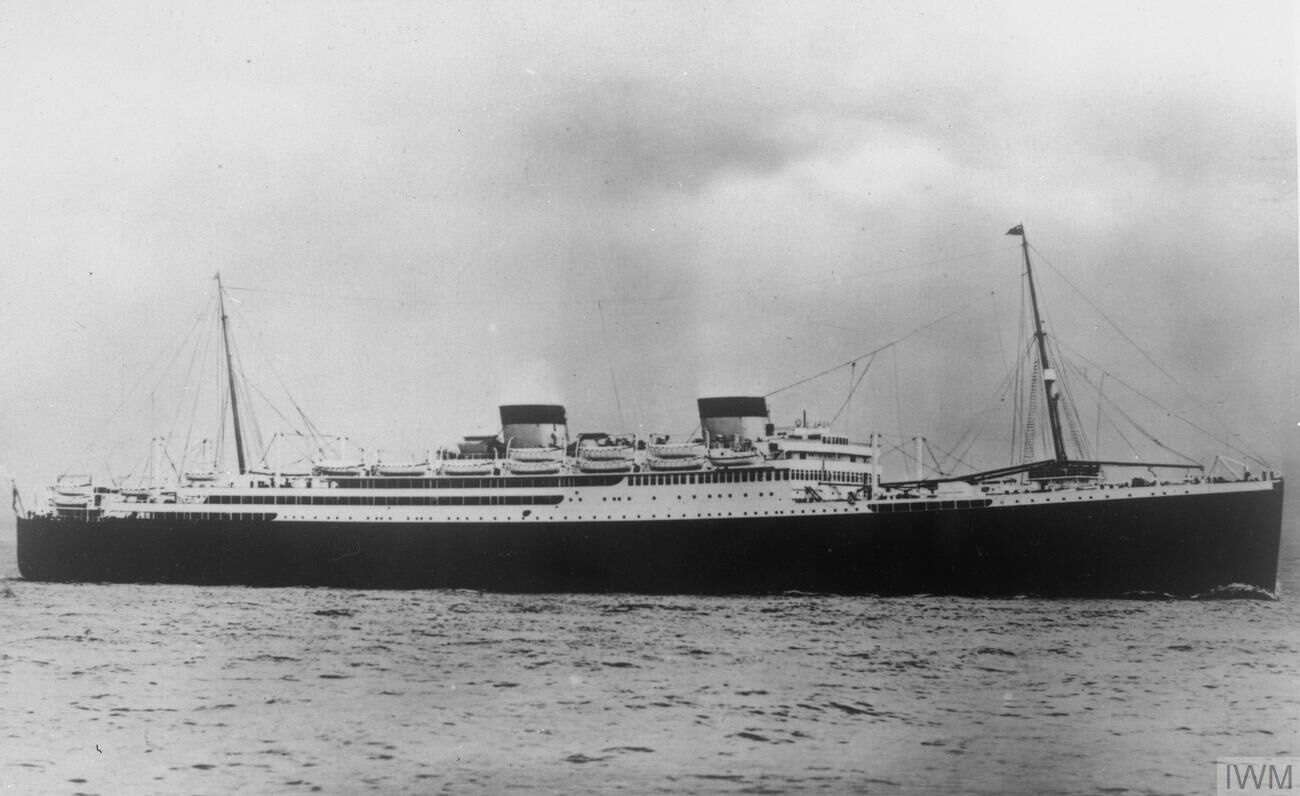
RMS Britannic

- Lieutenant Colonel Vuong Van Dong and Colonel Nguyen Chanh Thi led a coup attempt against President Ngo Dinh Diem of South Vietnam. The rebellion was put down 24 hours later.
- RMS Britannic, the last of the ocean liners of the White Star Line, sailed from Liverpool to New York City on its last voyage. Operated by Cunard Line since 1934, the Britannic was sold for scrap three weeks later.

== November 12, 1960 (Saturday) ==
- A Type 3 solar flare, described by an American astronomer as "one of the largest, if not the largest, ever recorded" disrupted communications worldwide. An aurora borealis, normally visible only at far north latitudes, could be seen in the early morning hours in much of the Northern Hemisphere, including Washington, D.C..
- Construction of the first Soviet nuclear submarine, the K-19, was completed, three days before the first American ballistic missile submarine (the USS George Washington) would set to sea with nuclear deterrent weapons. The U.S. Navy had already been operating nuclear submarines for five years. The K-19, which would receive its nuclear arsenal later, was the first of the eight "Hotel class" nuclear-powered subs.

== November 13, 1960 (Sunday) ==
- The Movimiento Revolucionario 13 de Noviembre, also known as MR-13, was born when leftist rebels within the Army of Guatemala, led by Lt. Marco Antonio Yon Sosa, attempted a coup against the government of President Miguel Ydígoras Fuentes. The coup was put down with American assistance, but the MR-13 group continued to fight against the Guatemalan government.
- A fire at a movie theatre in the Kurdish village of Amuda, Syria, killed 152 children who had been watching an "educational film". Some sources claim that the fire had been set by Syrian security forces.
- Turkey's President Cemal Gursel announced that the 38 member National Unity Committee, which had governed the nation since May, had dismissed 14 of its members, leaving Gursel and 23 advisors.
- African-American singer and actor Sammy Davis Jr. married white Swedish actress May Britt at a time when interracial marriage was uncommon, and, in some states, illegal. The resulting fallout would effectively end Britt's film career. The couple would have a daughter in 1961, and would adopt two sons, before separating in 1967 and divorcing in 1968.
- System checkout tests were completed on Mercury spacecraft No. 7. In the opinion of McDonnell, the results demonstrated that this spacecraft was adequate for a crewed mission.

== November 14, 1960 (Monday) ==
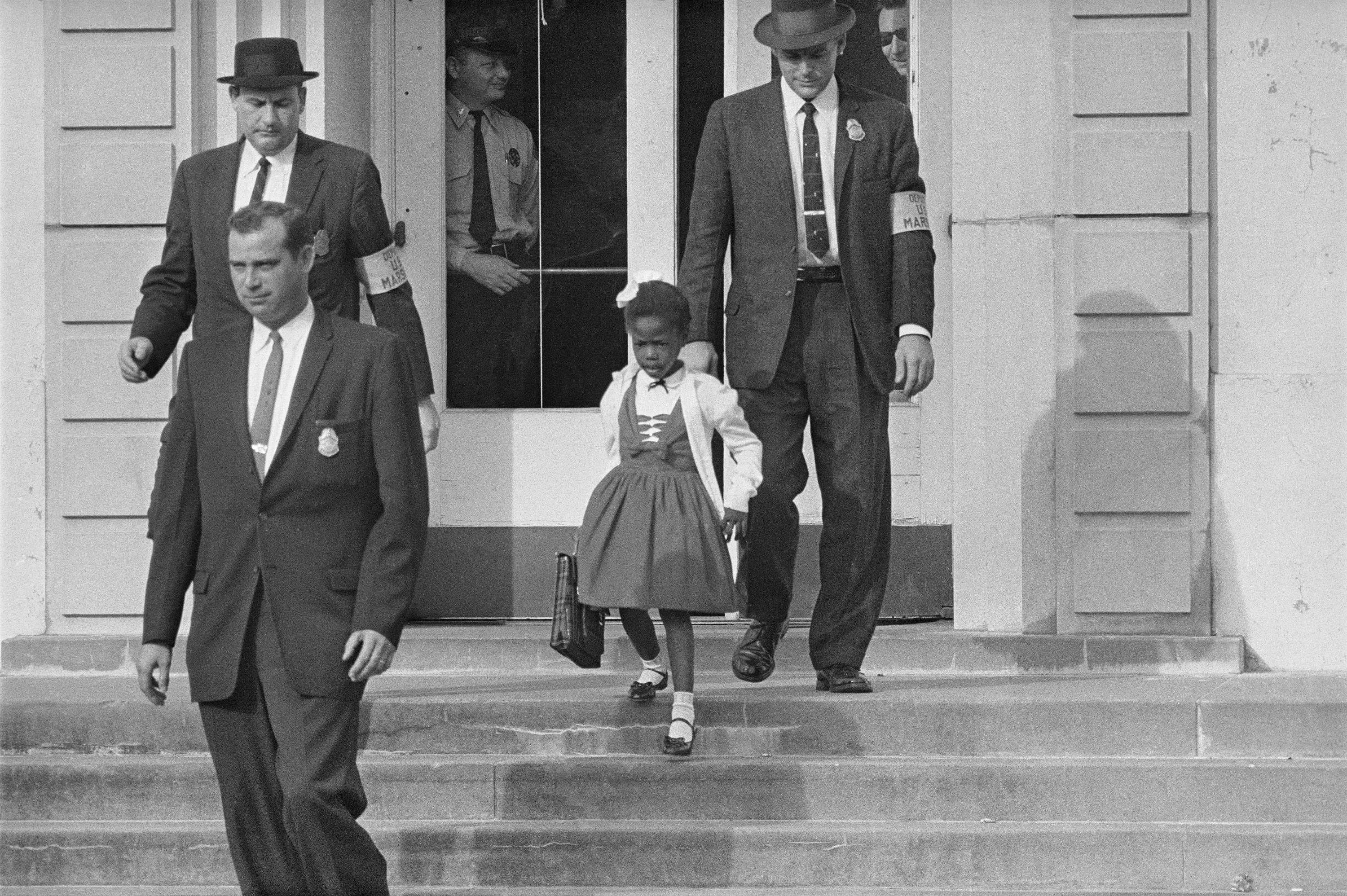
November 14, 1960: U.S. Marshals escorting Ruby Bridges to and from school

- Four 6-year old Black girls, "first of their race to attend white public schools in New Orleans since the days of the Reconstruction". The other three students enrolled at McDonough Elementary, were enrolled at two elementary schools in the area. Ruby Bridges, protected by U.S. Marshals, was the lone African-American child to enroll at the William Frantz Elementary School, and her first day was depicted by artist Norman Rockwell in a famous painting, The Problem We All Live With.
- A collision between two trains in Pardubice, Czechoslovakia killed 118 people and injured 110 others. The government news agency did not report the accident until noon the next day.
- Born: Francesco Schettino, Italian shipmaster who was the captain of the cruise ship Costa Concordia when the ship struck an underwater rock and capsized off the Italian island of Giglio on January 13, 2012; in Naples

== November 15, 1960 (Tuesday) ==
- The submarine USS George Washington, armed with 16 nuclear-tipped Polaris missiles, sailed from the harbor of Charleston, South Carolina, on an undisclosed route. President Eisenhower praised history's first mobile nuclear missile base, noting that the Polaris firing submarines "possess a power and relative invulnerability which will make suicidal any attempt by an aggressor to attack the free world by surprise". The U.S. Navy said that the 16 missiles had the same destructive power as "the total of all of the bombs dropped during World War II". The Polaris has been described as "the world's most credible deterrent system".

== November 16, 1960 (Wednesday) ==
- At the Moscow conference of the world's 81 Communist parties, Albania's Enver Hoxha criticized the parties of Soviet Union, Bulgaria, Poland and other Eastern European nations, in a speech entitled "Reject the Revisionist Theses of the 20th Congress of the Communist Party of the Soviet Union and the Anti-Marxist Stand of Khrushchev's Group! Uphold Marxism-Leninism!".
- A meeting was held at Langley Field by NASA personnel to discuss the causes for the failure of the uncrewed Mercury-Atlas 1 mission and to determine the status of readiness of the Mercury-Atlas 2 mission.

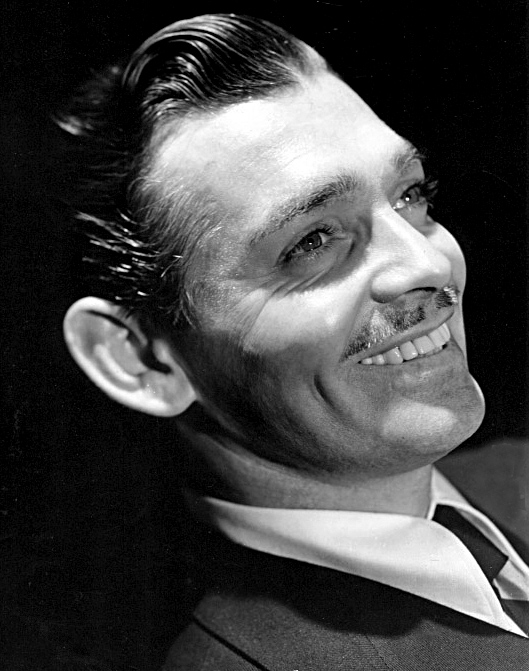
Gable

- Died:
  - Clark Gable, 59, American film actor, died of a heart attack, 12 days after completing his final film, The Misfits.
  - Gilbert Harding, 53, English broadcaster, died after collapsing on the steps of Broadcasting House following the recording of a radio programme.

== November 17, 1960 (Thursday) ==
- The Space Task Group requested that McDonnell submit a proposal for conducting a test to determine the capability of an astronaut to make celestial observations through the Mercury spacecraft observation window.
- The Uttar Pradesh Agricultural University (now called Govind Ballabh Pant University of Agriculture & Technology) was inaugurated at Pantnagar.
- Born:
  - RuPaul (stage name for Andre Charles), American singer, actor and drag queen, known primarily by his first name; in San Diego
  - Takashi Tezuka, Japanese video game designer, director, and producer for Nintendo; in Osaka
  - Jonathan Ross, English television and radio presenter; in London

== November 18, 1960 (Friday) ==
- In a major change of American policy, President Eisenhower ordered the aircraft carrier USS Shangri-La and four other United States Navy warships to patrol the coasts of Nicaragua and Guatemala, declaring that the U.S. would "use military force rather than diplomatic protests" to prevent Communism from spreading from Cuba to other nations in the Western Hemisphere.
- Spacecraft No. 8 was delivered to Cape Canaveral for the Mercury-Atlas 3 uncrewed orbital mission.
- Born: Kim Wilde (Kim Smith), English singer and the first child of singers Marty Wilde and Joyce Baker; in Chiswick, London

== November 19, 1960 (Saturday) ==
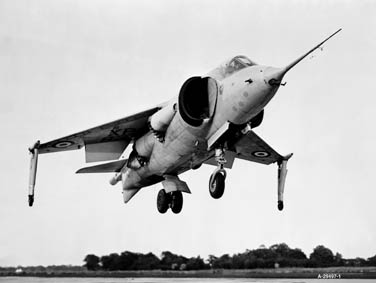
November 19, 1960: Hovering Hawker P.1127 takes flight

- The Hawker Siddeley P.1127, the first V/STOL jet aircraft (vertical short take-off and landing) capability, made its first untethered flight. Test pilot Bill Bedford lifted, hovered, and landed the jet at the Royal Aircraft Establishment ground at Thurleigh.
- Born: Miss Elizabeth (Elizabeth Ann Hulette), American wrestling manager; in Frankfort, Kentucky (died of a drug overdose, 2003)
- Died: Hans Hollmann, 61, German physicist

== November 20, 1960 (Sunday) ==
- In parliamentary elections for Japan, the Liberal Democratic Party, led by Hayato Ikeda, increased its majority in the 467 member House of Representatives, gaining 13 seats for a total of 296; the Japan Socialist Party gained 23 for a total of 145. Losing ground were the leftist Democratic Socialists, falling from 40 to 23. Ikeda told a news conference that the results showed that the Japanese people approved the U.S.-Japan Security Treaty that had been violently protested in the spring.

== November 21, 1960 (Monday) ==
- An attempt to launch the uncrewed Mercury-Redstone 1 rocket from Cape Canaveral failed when the premature cut-off of the launch vehicle engines activated the emergency escape system when the vehicle was only about 1 inch (25 mm) off the pad. The launch vehicle settled back on the pad with only slight damage. The undamaged spacecraft was recovered for reuse.
- United Nations troops clashed with the Congolese Army, for the first time since the Congo crisis had begun. Colonel Joseph Mobutu ordered soldiers to seize a diplomat at Ghana's embassy in Leopoldville. A force of 150 U.N. troops from Tunisia, supplementing Ghanaian embassy guards, fought for three hours in defending the embassy before the government troops withdrew.
- Phase II of the helicopter Mercury spacecraft airdrop program began and was completed by November 30.
- Died: Phao Siyanon, 50, former Interior Minister of Thailand and head of the Royal Thai Police until being fired in 1957, died of undisclosed causes while in exile in Switzerland.

== November 22, 1960 (Tuesday) ==
- The USS Ethan Allen, at 410 feet (120 m) in length the largest Polaris submarine in the U.S. Navy fleet, was launched from the yards at Groton, Connecticut. Not yet equipped with missiles, the submarine was designed to fire nuclear weapons a distance of 1,500 miles (2,400 km). On May 6, 1962, the Ethan Allen would make the only submarine launch of a live nuclear warhead, conducting an atmospheric hydrogen bomb test at a site 1,000 miles (1,600 km) away.
- Faced with a choice of two rival delegations claiming to represent the former Belgian Congo, one led by President Joseph Kasavubu, the other by Prime Minister Patrice Lumumba, the United Nations General Assembly voted 53–24 in favor of seating Kasavubu's group. Nineteen nations abstained. The vote effectively ended Lumumba's power in the Congo, and he would be arrested and killed two months later.

== November 23, 1960 (Wednesday) ==
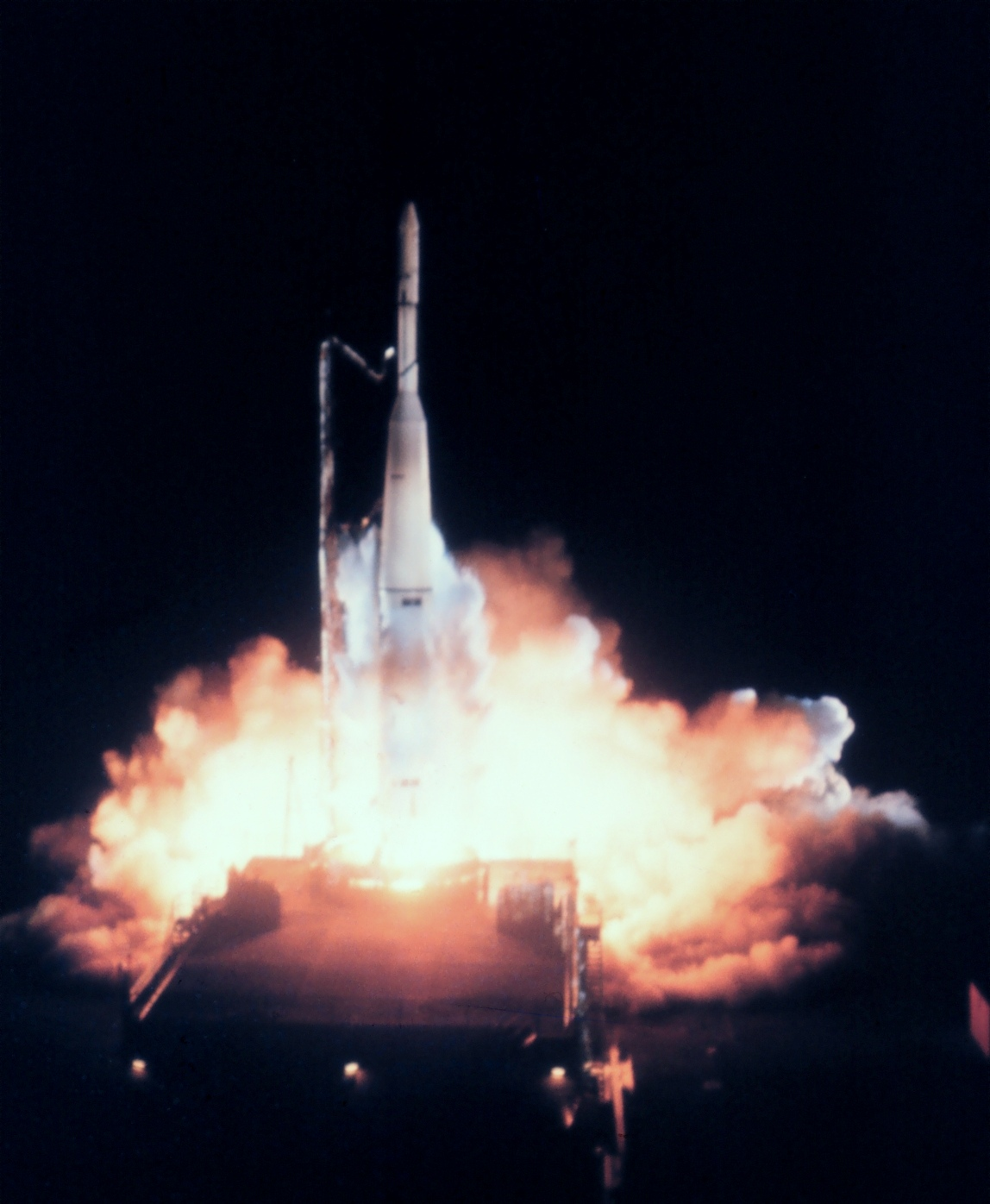
November 23, 1960: Launch of TIROS-2

- TIROS-2 was launched from the U.S. as the second weather satellite. It had five-channel infrared radiometer equipment to make night observations and estimate thickness of precipitation, and an attitude control system that permitted it to remain almost stationary over North America.

== November 24, 1960 (Thursday) ==
- Wilt Chamberlain, of the Philadelphia Warriors, set the NBA record for number of rebounds (55) in a game, which has remained unbroken for more than 60 years, but his team lost 132–129 to the visiting Boston Celtics, who were led by Bill Russell. Chamberlain's 55 rebounds broke the record of 51, set on February 8, 1959 by Bill Russell of the Boston Celtics. Chamberlain (23,924) and Russell (21,620) remain first and second on the all time rebound list.

== November 25, 1960 (Friday) ==
- In the Dominican Republic, three of the Mirabal sisters— Patria, Minerva, and María Teresa, outspoken opponents of dictator Rafael Trujillo, were assassinated along with their driver, Rufino de la Cruz, in what the government described as an "automobile accident". When it was discovered that the four had been violently strangled and beaten to death before their car was dumped into a ravine, on orders from Trujillo himself, public opinion turned against the dictator. Trujillo was assassinated six months later. The Mirabal sisters, popularly known as "Las Mariposas", were later the subject of the Julia Alvarez novel and the film adaptation, In the Time of the Butterflies. November the 25th is observed annually as "White Ribbon Day" in recognition of the sisters and other victims of violence against women.
- The last four daytime radio dramas—Young Dr. Malone, The Right to Happiness, The Second Mrs. Burton and Ma Perkins, all broadcast on the CBS Radio Network—were brought to an end. With more Americans turning from radio listeners to television viewers, the popularity of radio network programs had steadily declined since 1946.
- Born:
  - John F. Kennedy Jr., at Georgetown University Hospital, 16 days after his father was elected to the presidency of the United States; in Washington, D.C. (died in plane crash, 1999)
  - Amy Grant, American gospel music singer; in Augusta, Georgia

== November 26, 1960 (Saturday) ==
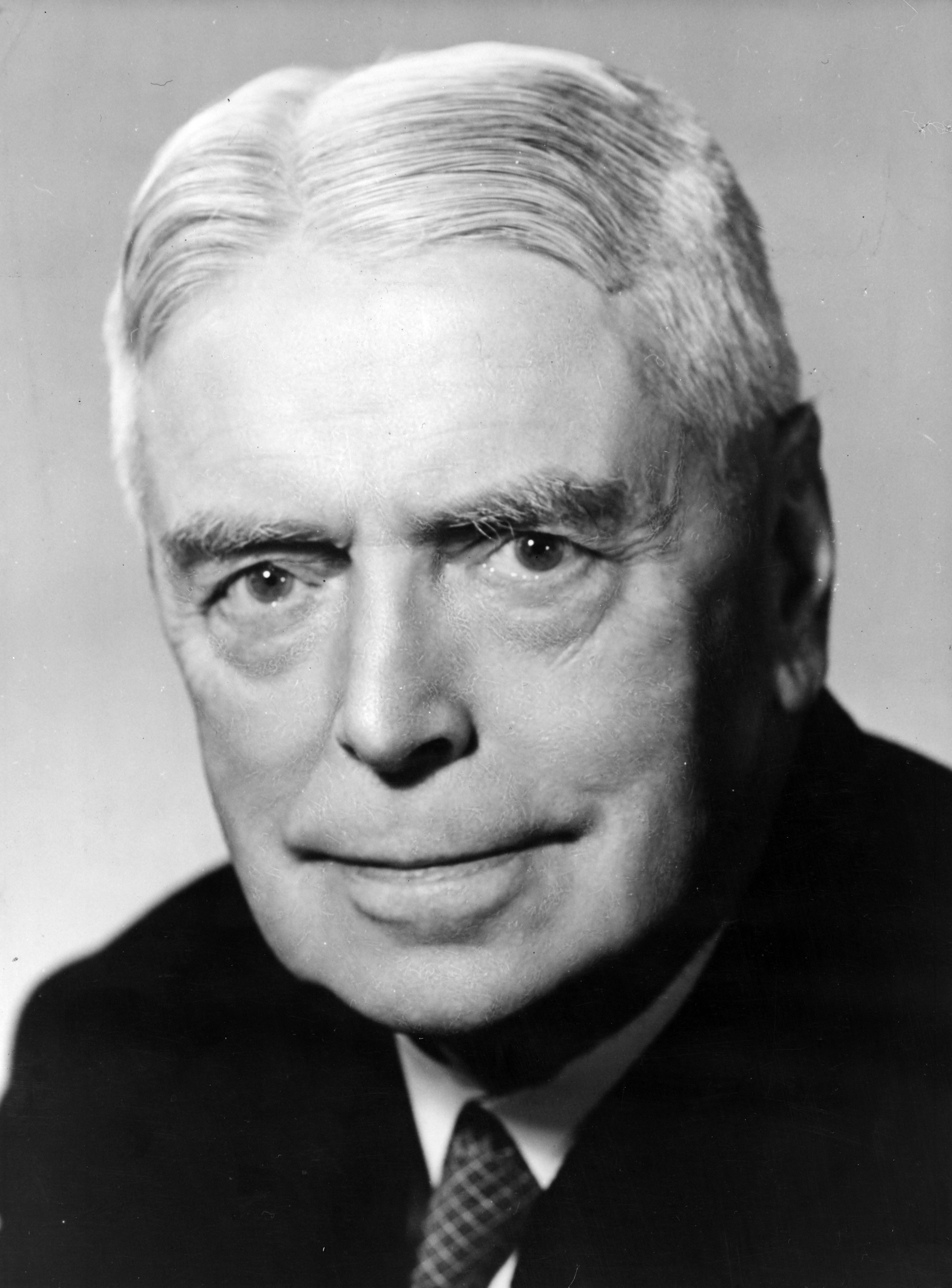
Keith Holyoake (National) and Walter Nash (Labour)
- In elections for New Zealand Parliament, the National Party, led by Keith Holyoake, gained control of Parliament, gaining 7 seats from Prime Minister Walter Nash's Labour Party, and taking a 46–34 majority. Holyoake would take office as Prime Minister on December 12, and serve until 1972.
- In what one author has described as "a cornerstone event in the history of the psychedelic counterculture in the United States", Harvard University professor Timothy Leary invited beat generation poets Allen Ginsberg and Peter Orlovsky to his home, where the three partook of the hallucinogenic drug psilocybin.
- Philippine Airlines Flight 526 crashed into Mount Baco on the island of Mindoro, an hour after takeoff from Iloilo on the island of Panay en route to Manila, killing all 29 passengers and the crew of four.

== November 27, 1960 (Sunday) ==
- The ABC television network first broadcast Issues and Answers, a Sunday morning interview show to compete with NBC's Meet the Press and CBS's Face the Nation.
- Born: Yulia Tymoshenko, Prime Minister of Ukraine for eight months in 2005 and from 2007 to 2010; in Dnipropetrovsk, Ukrainian SSR, Soviet Union
- Died: Donald Richberg, 79, American lawyer and civil servant, aide to President Franklin D. Roosevelt, executive director of the National Recovery Administration co-author of the statutory language of the National Industrial Recovery Act and the Taft-Hartley Act

== November 28, 1960 (Monday) ==
- The African state of Mauritania became independent shortly after midnight, with Moktar Ould Daddah receiving the transfer of sovereignty from France's Prime Minister, Michel Debre. Daddah declared that "Mauritania ... will never forget what she owes the French people."
- A faint SOS Morse Code signal was allegedly heard from a troubled spacecraft in Earth orbit, suggesting that an unannounced crewed Soviet space mission had failed.
- Born: John Galliano, British fashion designer; in Gibraltar
- Died: Richard Wright, American novelist (b. 1908)

== November 29, 1960 (Tuesday) ==
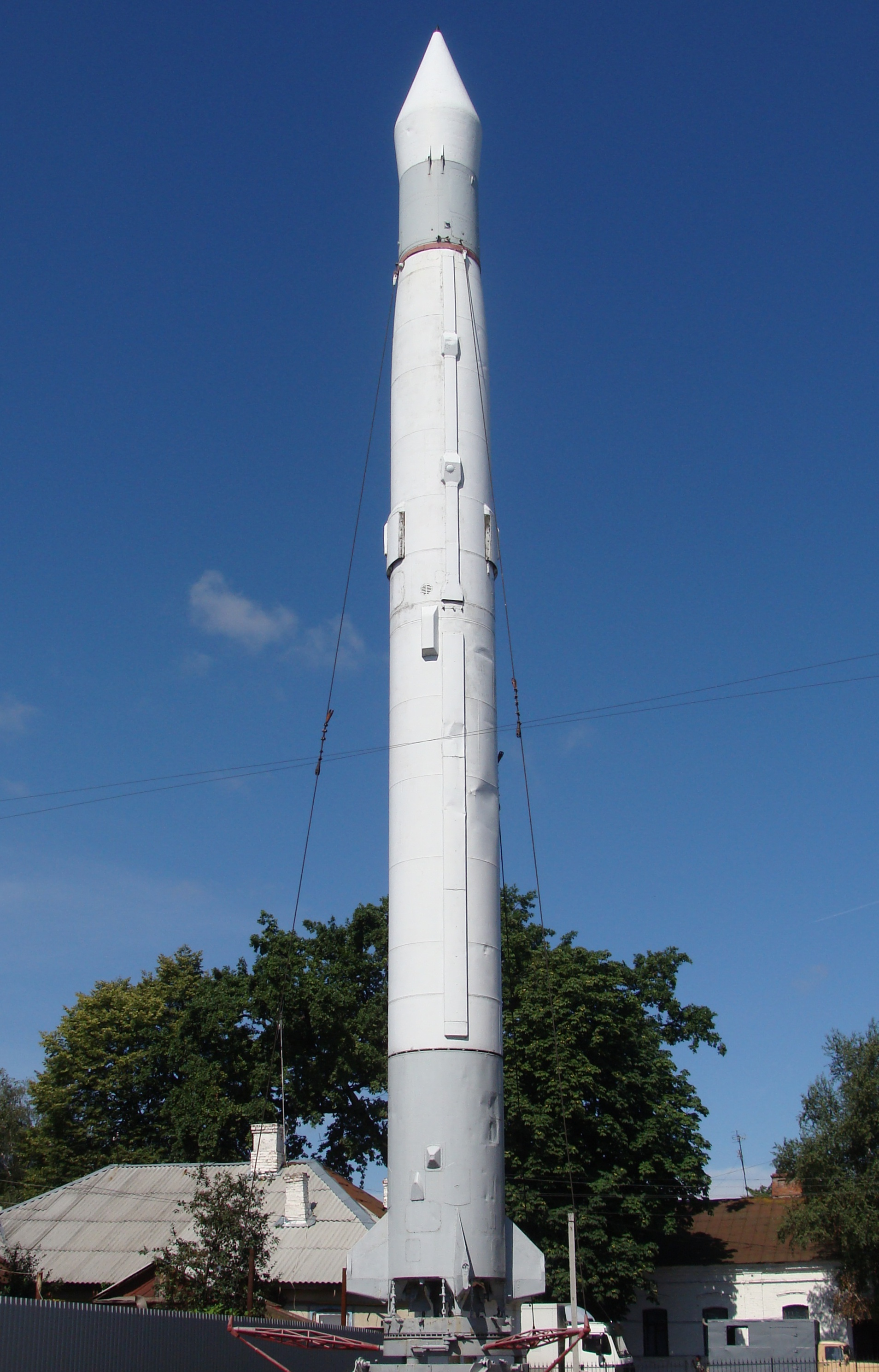
An R-5, the first missile to be struck by an anti-ballistic missile

- The V-1000, the Soviet Union's first anti-ballistic missile, scored its first success, intercepting and destroying an incoming R-5 Pobeda missile in a test at Sary Shagan.
- The Minnesota Golden Gophers won the national championship for the 1960 college football season, finishing first in the final AP poll and the United Press International (UPI) Coaches Poll. With 433 1/3 points based on voting by 48 sportswriters, the Minnesota Gophers edged out Mississippi (411) and Iowa (407 1/2).
- CIA Director Allen Dulles briefed U.S. President-elect John F. Kennedy on the agency's plans to overthrow the Castro government. Kennedy told Dulles to continue with the project, which ultimately failed as the Bay of Pigs Invasion.
- Seventeen high school students were killed, and 24 injured, when their bus was struck by a freight train at a railroad crossing in Lamont, Alberta.

== November 30, 1960 (Wednesday) ==
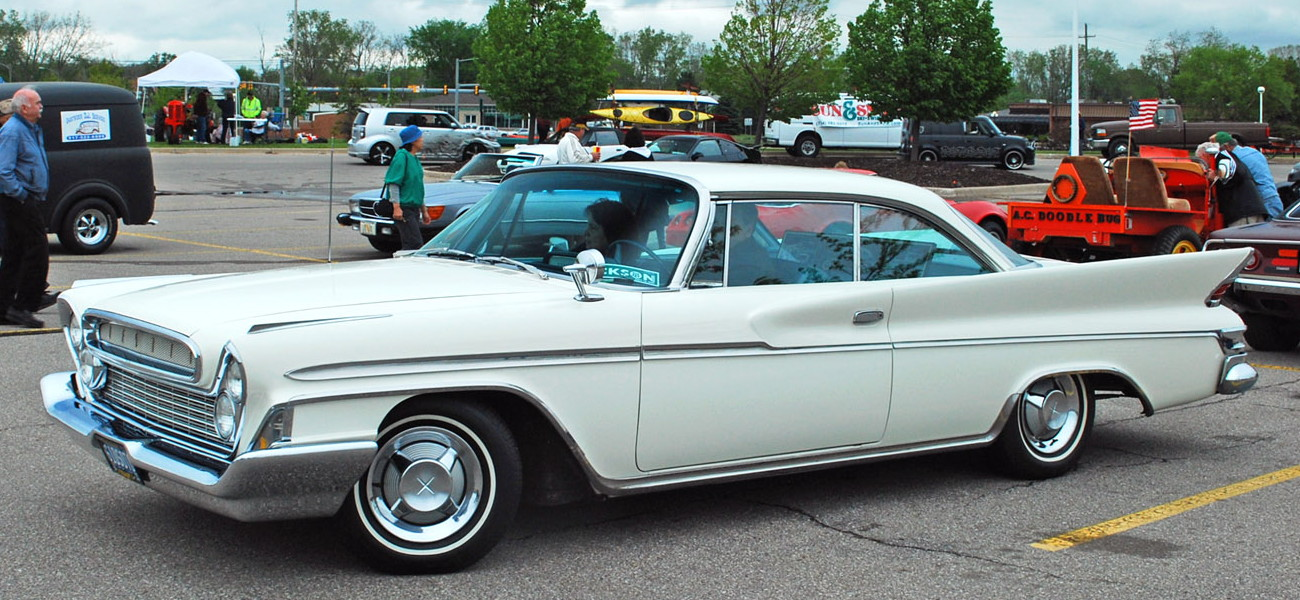
One of the last DeSoto cars, the 1961 Fireflite

- Ten days after the Chrysler Corporation announced that it was ceasing production of its DeSoto line of automobiles, the very last DeSoto was built. Chrysler had built an additional 300 after the announcement to fill orders.
- Born:
  - Bill Halter, American politician, Lieutenant Governor of Arkansas from 2007 to 2011; in Little Rock
  - Gary Lineker, English footballer and sports broadcaster; in Leicester
- Died: Henri Bouchard, 84, French sculptor
