= January 1964 =

Month of 1964

<<	January 1964					>>
Su	Mo	Tu	We	Th	Fr	Sa
			1	2	3	4
5	6	7	8	9	10	11
12	13	14	15	16	17	18
19	20	21	22	23	24	25
26	27	28	29	30	31

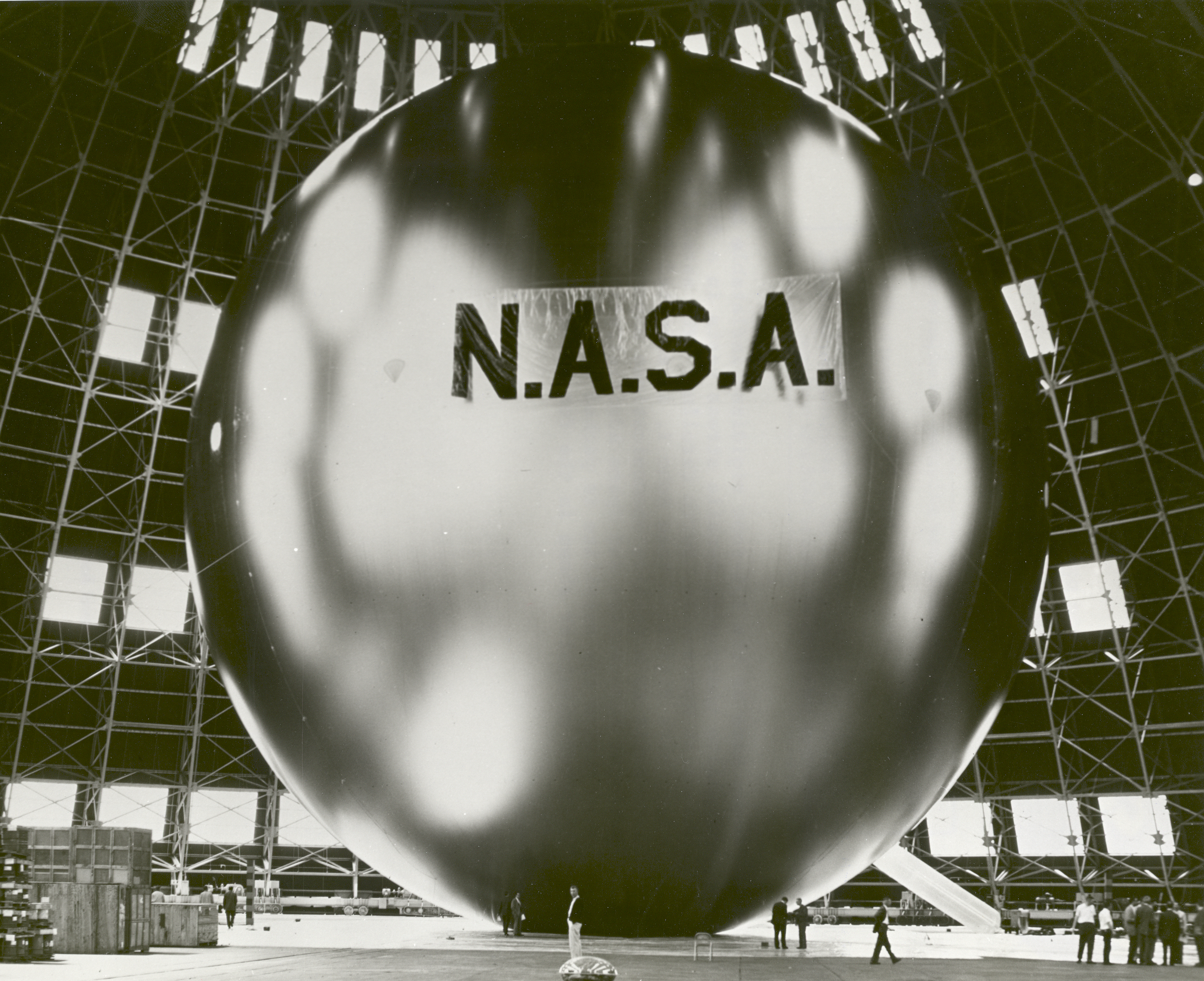
January 25, 1964: Echo 2, largest artificial satellite ever, put into orbit

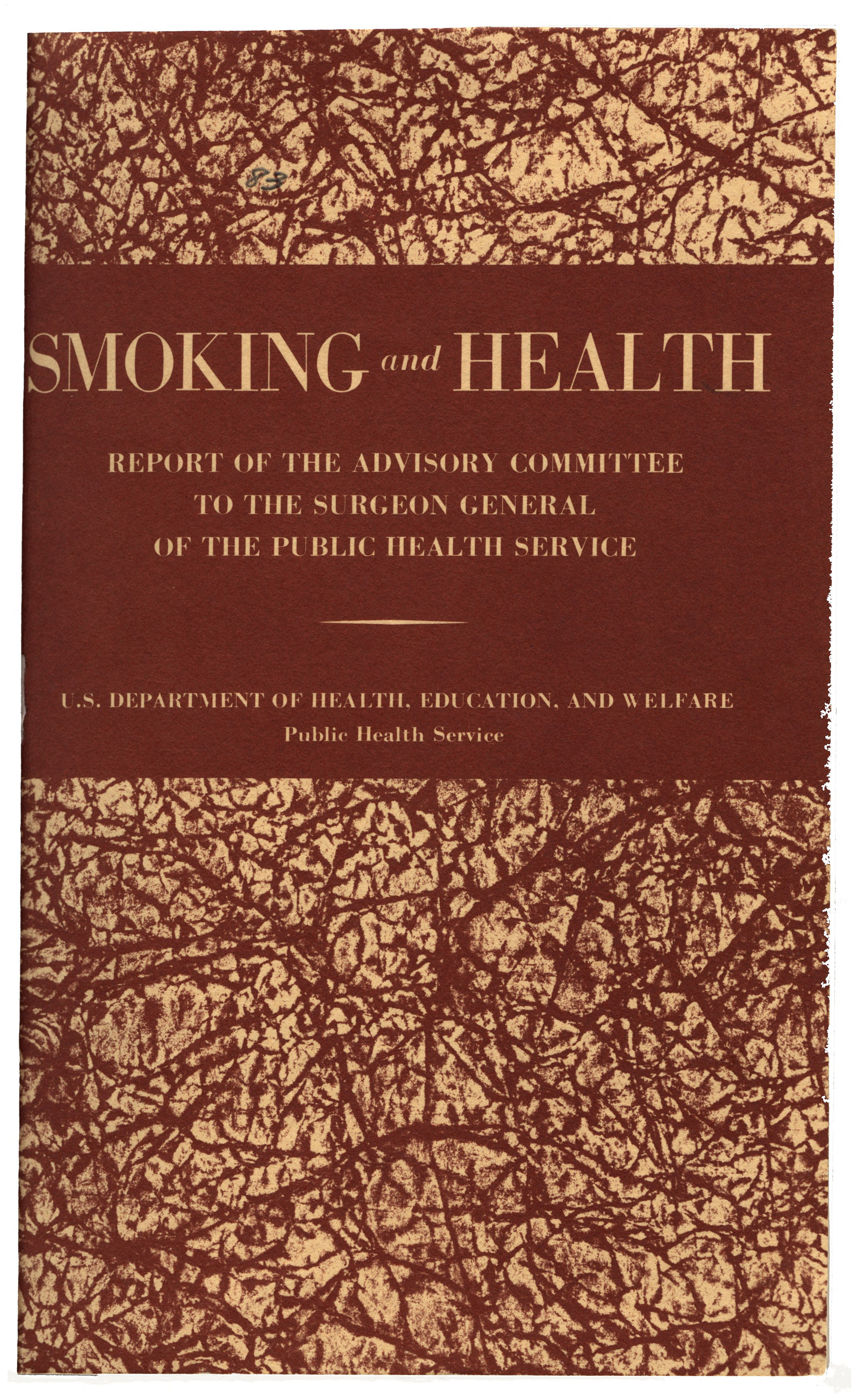
January 11, 1964: U.S. government panel links cigarettes to lung cancer

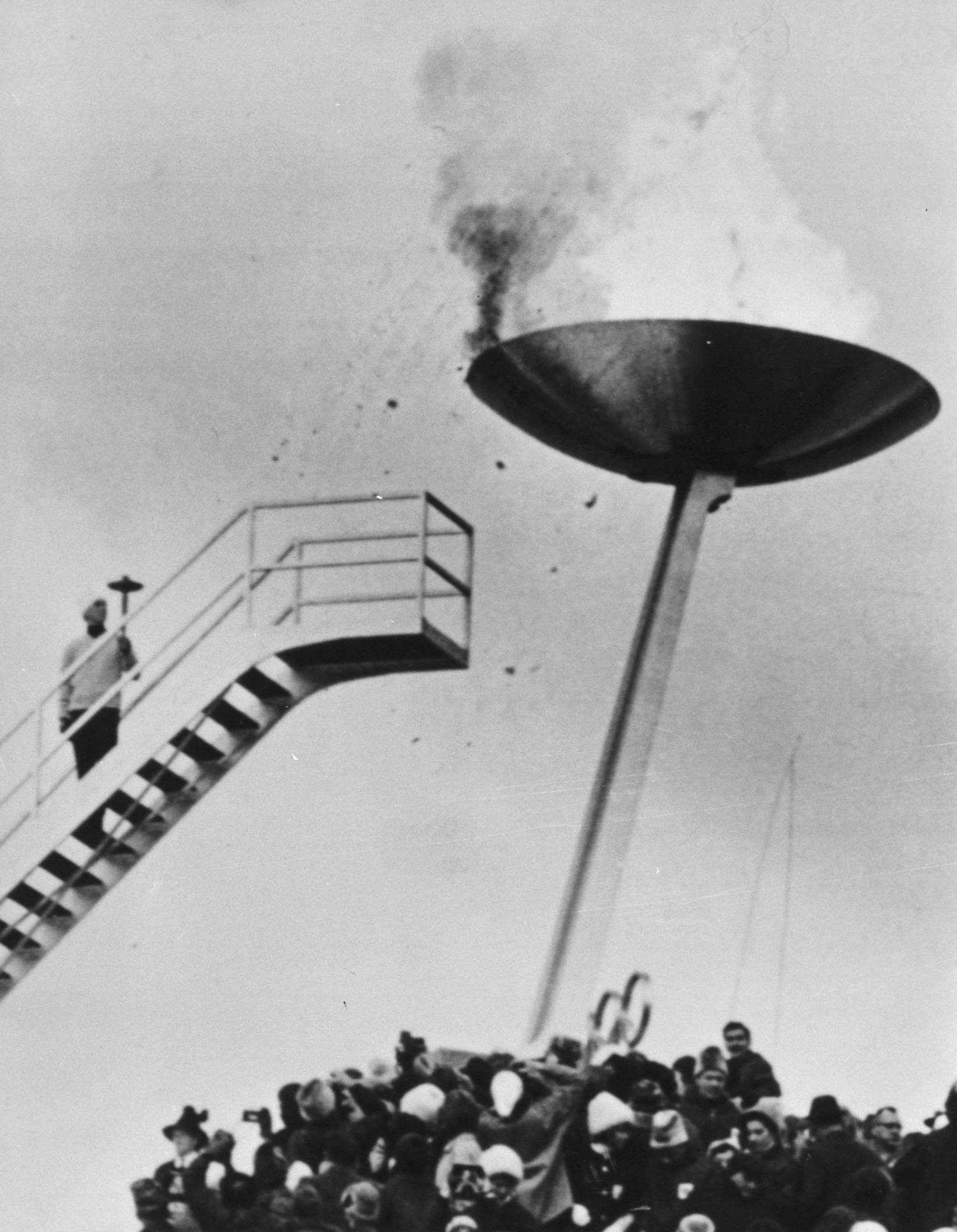
January 29, 1964: Josef Rieder opens the Winter Olympics at Innsbruck

The following events occurred in January 1964:

== January 1, 1964 (Wednesday) ==
Northern Rhodesia...

... now Zambia

Southern Rhodesia...

... now Zimbabwe

Nyasaland...

... now Malawi

- The Federation of Rhodesia and Nyasaland dissolved and was split into Northern Rhodesia (now Zambia), Southern Rhodesia (now Zimbabwe) and Nyasaland (now Malawi).
- In the second matchup in as many years between the top two college football teams in the United States, the #1 Texas Longhorns defeated the #2 Navy Midshipmen, 28–6, in the Cotton Bowl game at Dallas. Texas had already been awarded the then-mythical national college football championship because the last AP and UPI polls had been taken at the end of the 1963 regular season.
- The British music chart television program, Top of the Pops, made its debut on the BBC network. The program would later become one of the world's longest-running weekly music show in television history.
- Idlewild Airport in New York City officially became John F. Kennedy International Airport after midnight. Baggage tags that had carried the code "IDL" would thenceforth be designated "JFK".
- The rural municipality of Glemmen was merged into the city of Fredrikstad, Norway.
- NASA ordered removal of the radar and rendezvous evaluation pod from the Gemini 3 and Gemini 4 missions for use in Gemini 5, thus delaying the first planned docking with a separate spacecraft.
- Born: Captain Moussa Dadis Camara, President of Guinea from 2008 to 2010; in Koulé

== January 2, 1964 (Thursday) ==
- Major General Victor H. Krulak of the U.S. Marines, along with a committee of experts asked to advise on the Vietnam War, submitted a recommendation to U.S. President Johnson for a three phase series of covert actions against North Vietnam. Phase I, for February to May, called for propaganda dissemination and "20 destructive undertakings... designed to result in substantial destruction, economic loss and harassment", and a second and third phase of increasing magnitude.
- A police constable on guard outside the residence of Ghana's president, Kwame Nkrumah, fired five gunshots at him in an assassination attempt. Seth Ametwee invaded The Flagstaff House in Accra and missed with his first shot. Nkrumah's bodyguard, Salifu Dagarti, shielded the President with his body and was mortally wounded. It marked the sixth attempt on Nkrumah's life since he came to power in 1957.
- A U.S. Air Force C-124 Globemaster cargo plane with nine people on board disappeared while flying over the Pacific Ocean, on its way to Hickam Air Force Base in Honolulu from Wake Island. Another pilot, flying on the same route, said that he had heard a distinct S.O.S. signal that would have transmitted automatically from the plane and the rafts.
- Born: Pernell Whitaker, American professional boxer, undisputed world lightweight (1990–1992); in Norfolk, Virginia (d. 2019)

== January 3, 1964 (Friday) ==
- U.S. Senator Barry Goldwater of Arizona announced that he would seek the Republican nomination for President of the United States. Goldwater said in a statement that "I have not heard from any announced Republican candidate a declaration of conscience or of political position that could possibly offer to the American people a clear choice in the next presidential election," and added that "I will not change my beliefs to win votes. I will offer a choice, not an echo."
- A U.S. Air Force B-57 jet bomber narrowly missed crashing into Beavercreek High School in Beavercreek, Ohio, United States, while school was in session with 1,000 students, and the wreckage came down a few feet away from the building. The pilot had safely ejected after the bomber exploded in mid-air while en route to Wright-Patterson Air Force Base in Dayton, Ohio.
- Holden Roberto, leader of National Liberation Front of Angola (FNLA) that was fighting for the liberation of the Portuguese colony of Angola, announced that he would accept an offer of military aid from Communist China and declared, "Only the Communists can give us what we need."
- Millions of Americans got their first view of The Beatles and heard their new song, "She Loves You", as they watched film footage on The Jack Paar Program.
- The Irish soap opera Tolka Row was broadcast for the first time, by Telefís Éireann.

== January 4, 1964 (Saturday) ==
- Ivan Asen Christof Georgiev, a 56-year-old Bulgarian diplomat who had once been the Eastern European nation's delegate to the United Nations, was executed by firing squad after pleading guilty to spying for the United States. Georgiev had testified at his trial on December 26 that he had sold military secrets to the CIA between 1956 and 1961, although the United States denied being aware of any connection to Georgiev. Prosecutors charged that he had received $200,000; that he had spent most of the money "to support mistresses"; and that "the CIA was so satisfied with Georgiev's work that he was given a diploma commending his services."
- A commuter train pulling into the station at Jajinci, 8 miles (13 km) south of the Yugoslavian capital, Belgrade, crashed into the back of another train that was awaiting departure. Sixty-six people were killed, and 157 were injured. Both trains were filled with passengers who were returning to work after the New Year holiday; the commuter train was on its way from Belgrade to Pozarevac and traveling in the fog before dawn, and the engineer on board said that he had seen no signal to indicate that the track was blocked. The impact was severe enough to crush eight of the coaches on the train at the station.
- The Mo-e-Muqaddas, an important Islamic holy relic which had been stolen on December 27, 1963 from the Hazratbal Shrine in Srinagar, was recovered seven days after it disappeared. The disappearance of the item, a 600-year-old strand of hair from the beard of Muhammad, had led to riots in the Jammu & Kashmir state because it was sacred to India's Kashmiri Muslims and a symbol of their faith, and one author would note that it "was somewhat miraculously recovered and returned to its original site." The authenticity of the returned Mo-e-Muqaddas would be verified in a ceremony on February 3.
- Pope Paul VI became the first Roman Catholic pontiff to fly in an airplane, the first to visit the Holy Land, and the first to venture outside Italy since Pius VII in 1809. Pope Paul departed from Rome on a chartered Alitalia DC-8 jet to Amman, Jordan, and was welcomed in the Muslim kingdom by King Hussein. Afterward, the Pope and his party traveled by motorcade to the border crossing at Jenin (then a part of Jordan) and into Nazareth in Israel, followed by a welcome by over 100,000 at Jerusalem.
- İsmet İnönü, the Prime Minister of Turkey, won a vote of confidence in the Turkish National Assembly. The vote in the İnönü government's favor was 225 to 175, but not without the help of 46 votes from an opposition group, the New Turkey Party, raising the question of whether the Premier's Republicans and Independents coalition could remain in power without the New Turkey party support.
- Mary Sullivan, a 19-year-old clerk at a finance company in Boston, became the 13th and last victim of the Boston Strangler. Her two roommates found her nude body after they returned from work to their apartment on Charles Street at Beacon Hill. As with other victims, Sullivan had been raped, and then strangled with a scarf.
- Harold A. Franklin became the first African-American student to be enrolled at Auburn University in Alabama. A team of three United States marshals was parked across the street to protect Franklin from violence and intimidation by the crowd and by 100 Alabama state policemen.
- Born: Dot-Marie Jones, American TV actress, 15-time world women's arm-wrestling champion, and women's shot-put record holder; in Turlock, California

== January 5, 1964 (Sunday) ==
- In the first meeting between leaders of the Roman Catholic and Eastern Orthodox churches since the 15th century, Pope Paul VI and Patriarch Athenagoras I of Constantinople greeted each other in Jerusalem at 8:30 in the evening. The last meeting between the Rome and Constantinople churches had taken place in 1538, when Pope Eugene IV and Patriarch Joseph II had conferred at Ferrara starting on March 8. Pope Paul traveled the next day to Bethlehem and visited the Church of the Nativity, followed by a second meeting with the Patriarch.
- Quotations from Chairman Mao Tse-tung, commonly known as "The Little Red Book", was first published in the People's Republic of China, initially for review by participants at a conference of China's Political Department, which approved it for distribution within the People's Liberation Army starting on May 16. The first edition had 200 quotes selected by editor Tang Pinzhu. By 1966, an update with 366 quotes would be distributed nationwide to all of China's citizens.
- The first presidential election in the Central African Republic was held. President David Dacko, who had banned all political parties except for his own MESAN (Mouvement pour l'évolution sociale de l'Afrique noire or "Movement for the Social Evolution of Black Africa") was the only candidate on the ballot.
- French psychoanalyst Jacques Lacan began the first of his popular seminars at the École pratique des hautes études in Paris. "Lacan's seminars or 'shows'... were also part of the Parisian society calendar," an author would note later, "thereby integrating a part of the bourgeois public."
- The San Diego Chargers beat the visiting Boston Patriots to win the American Football League championship.
- Died: William Bartholomae Jr., 70, American multimillionaire and yachtsman, as well as an oil, mining and ranching executive, was stabbed to death in his kitchen in Newport Beach, California by his sister-in-law, Carmen Gallardo.

== January 6, 1964 (Monday) ==
- British vehicle manufacturer Leyland Motors signed a contract with the Communist government of Fidel Castro for the sale of buses to the Cuban government, challenging the United States blockade of Cuba. Under the deal, negotiated with the Cuban state trading organization Transimport, 400 Leyland-MCW Olympic buses and spare parts would be delivered to Cuba within 12 months at a cost of £3.7 million (US$11,000,000) and Cuba had a five-year option to buy 1,000 more vehicles at a similar price.
- Sir Kenneth Maddocks was replaced as Governor of Fiji by Sir Derek Jakeway.
- Born: Henry Maske, German professional boxer and IBF world light heavyweight champion from 1993 to 1996, as well as Olympic gold medalist middleweight champion in 1988; in Treuenbrietzen, East Germany

== January 7, 1964 (Tuesday) ==
- After spending more than $230,000,000 to develop the proposed Typhon missile, the U.S. Navy abandoned further work on the project. General Dynamics had contracted with the Navy to design a "shipboard surface-to-air missile" that could "launch missiles simultaneously against a number of aircraft", but the system was too large for use on most of the ships in the American naval fleet.
- Sir Roland Theodore Symonette became the first Prime Minister of the Bahamas as the British colony was given self-rule in advance of its eventual independence. Symonette had previously been the Chief Minister for three Bahamian governors and was the wealthiest native of the Bahamas at the time. The only white Bahamian Premier, he would serve until 1967.
- Born: Nicolas Cage (stage name for Nicolas Kim Coppola), American film actor; in Long Beach, California
- Died: Howard Baker Sr., 61, U.S. Congressman for Tennessee since 1951, died of a heart attack while shaving at his home in Knoxville, Tennessee.

== January 8, 1964 (Wednesday) ==
- In his first State of the Union Address, U.S. President Lyndon B. Johnson announced a massive reform of federal spending dubbed the "War on Poverty" Asking Congress immediately, "let us work together to make this year's session the best in the nation's history... as the session which declared all-out war on human poverty and unemployment in these United States," Johnson told Americans watching television, "This administration today, here and now, declares unconditional war on poverty in America. I urge this Congress and all Americans to join with me in that effort."
- India's Prime Minister Jawaharlal Nehru suffered a stroke while visiting the city of Bhubaneswar in the Odisha state. During his recovery, he brought former Minister of Home Affairs Lal Bahadur Shastri back into his Cabinet as a minister without portfolio. On May 27, Nehru would die, and Shastri would become his successor.
- Edward Z. Gray, NASA's Director of Advanced Studies in the Office of Manned Space Flight, predicted that NASA's version of a space station would be more sophisticated than the Defense Department's Manned Orbiting Laboratory. Gray said that NASA had more than a dozen study projects under way. In response, James J. Haggerty Jr., of the Army-Navy-Air Force Journal and Register, called the assignment to DOD of the Manned Orbiting Laboratory "an ominous harbinger of a reversal in trend, an indication that the military services may play a more prominent role in future space exploration at NASA's expense.... Whether you label it development platform, satellite platform, satellite or laboratory, it is clearly intended as a beginning for space station technology. It is also clearly the intent of this administration that, at least in the initial stages, space station development shall be under military rather than civil cognizance...."
- Died: Julius Raab, 72, Chancellor of Austria from 1953 to 1961

== January 9, 1964 (Thursday) ==
Demonstrators in Panama

Panama

U.S.A.

- At 7:30 in the morning, a student at Balboa High School in the U.S.-controlled Panama Canal Zone raised the American flag at a flagpole outside the school building, marking the third day in a row that the American students had defied the Zone Governor's order that no flags be raised at schools until the Panamanian flag could be flown alongside. Despite growing bitterness between the Americans inside the Zone and the Panamanians outside, Governor Robert Fleming departed on a previously scheduled flight to Washington that afternoon "in a blunder he came to regret". High school students at the Instituto Nacional in Panama City were given permission by their principal to make a peaceful march to Balboa High School, and at 4:50 in the afternoon, about 200 students and four teachers walked through an unguarded entrance to the Canal Zone. Zonian policemen then stopped the group and allowed six students to carry a Panamanian flag to Balboa High, where American students and adults were waiting for them. In the confrontation that followed, the Instituto's flag received some rips, and U.S. police ordered all students out of the Zone. By 7:30, word had spread of the humiliating incident, and over 3,000 Panamanians tried to force their way across the boundary. Since there were only 80 Zone policemen, the acting governor, U.S. Army Colonel David Parker, asked for American soldiers to defend the area at 8:00, and the rioting escalated. Panama's President Roberto Chiari refused to allow Panama's civilian police to respond to the violence, and the rioting spread to the city of Colón. By the time the violence subsided on Sunday, 21 Panamanians and four American soldiers were dead, and 465 Panamanians and 103 Americans were injured or wounded. The Balboa High School student who had organized the flag raising, a 17-year-old boy, would tell reporters later that his only regret was the deaths of the four American soldiers. January 9 is now observed in Panama as a public holiday referred to as "Martyrs' Day" (Día de los Mártires).
- All but one of the 31 people on board Aerotransportes Litoral Argentino (ALA) Flight 143 were killed when the DC-3 airliner crashed short of the runway as it was attempting to make an emergency landing at the city of Zárate. The plane had caught fire while flying from Rosario to Buenos Aires, and the pilot was forced to try a landing in a field 6 miles (9.7 km) from the Zarate airport.

== January 10, 1964 (Friday) ==
- Chicago's Vee-Jay Records released Introducing... The Beatles to get the jump on Capitol Records' release of Meet the Beatles!, scheduled for January 20. Capitol obtained a restraining order against Vee-Jay on January 16 to prevent further sales, although Vee-Jay would defy the order by releasing the album again on February 10 and spending nine weeks with the second most popular selling album, behind Capitol's number one seller.
- Panama severed diplomatic relations with the United States, and its representative to the United Nations demanded that the U.S. surrender control of the Canal Zone and the Panama Canal to Panamanian sovereignty. The death toll at the end of the day was 27 people, 24 of whom were Panamanian civilians and three who were American soldiers. Relations would be resumed on April 3.

== January 11, 1964 (Saturday) ==
- United States Surgeon General Luther Leonidas Terry released the report of a committee of experts and made the first American governmental acknowledgment that smoking could be hazardous to one's health. The 387-page document, Smoking and Health: Report of the Advisory Committee to the Surgeon General of the Public Health Service, was written by a select committee of 11 scientists (five of whom were cigarette smokers). It was not released to the press until 9:00 on a Saturday morning, a day chosen because the American stock markets were closed during the weekend and in order to reach the greatest number of readers in Sunday newspapers; and only then to a gathering of journalists who were invited to a secure auditorium at the U.S. State Department building and not allowed to use a telephone until the press conference was over. The panel noted that 41,000 Americans died of lung cancer in 1962, while another 15,000 died from bronchitis and emphysema, and over half a million from arteriosclerotic heart disease and concluded that "Average smokers had a nine-to-tenfold risk of developing lung cancer compared to nonsmokers, and heavy smokers had at least a twenty-fold risk." The Advisory Committee unanimously endorsed the statement that "Cigarette smoking is a health hazard of sufficient importance in the United States to warrant appropriate remedial action." The effect was an 18% drop in cigarette use from the year before, when per capita consumption had reached a record high of 4,345 cigarettes per year (12 per day for every person in the U.S.); an author would note in 1999 "In 1966, about 43% of American adults regularly smoked cigarettes; today about 25% do."
- A private pilot and his three neighbors were killed when his Mooney M20 airplane crashed into the 28th floor of the Southwestern Bell building in downtown Kansas City, Missouri, 300 feet (91 m) above 11th Street and Oak Street. Because it was 5:35 p.m. on a Saturday, nobody inside the building was injured, and no pedestrians were struck by the debris, which was scattered across several blocks. The group was returning from a hunting trip in Buffalo, Missouri and ran into snow and fog as they approached the city.
- The British teenage girls' magazine Jackie was published for the first time.
- Died: Bechara El Khoury, 73, the first President of Lebanon, who served from 1943 to 1952

== January 12, 1964 (Sunday) ==
- Only a month after Zanzibar had been granted full independence, its predominantly Arab government was overthrown by the predominantly members of the Afro-Shirazi Party. The Zanzibar Revolution was led by John Okello, who dubbed himself "Field Marshal" of the revolution. Just after midnight, Okello and his men seized the police station in Mtoni, north of the capital, Zanzibar City. After emptying the station of its arsenal of weapons, Okello's men took control of the seat of government by dawn, and controlled the radio station at Ng'ambo. From there, Field Marshal Okello directed a nationwide massacre of Asian and Arab residents, and over the week that followed, between 5,000 and 15,000 were killed. Okello's radio broadcasts and threats were bizarre, with promises that if the public disregarded orders, he would take measures "88 times stronger than at present" and that "We, the army have the strength of 99 million, 99 thousand." Later in the day, the leader of the Afro-Shirazi Party, Sheikh Abeid Karume, declared himself the first President of the People's Republic of Zanzibar; by then, the last monarch of the Sultanate of Zanzibar, Jamshid bin Abdullah Al Said, had fled the country along with Prime Minister Muhammad Shamte Hamadi. The destroyer ship USS Manley, which had been on patrol in the Indian Ocean, evacuated 61 U.S. citizens from the island nation, which would merge three months later with Tanganyika to form the Republic of Tanzania.
- Born: Jeff Bezos, American billionaire and computer scientist who founded Amazon.com; in Albuquerque, New Mexico

== January 13, 1964 (Monday) ==
- In Manchester, New Hampshire, 14-year-old Pamela Mason was murdered after being lured from her home on the pretext of a babysitting job. Pamela and an acquaintance both had placed their telephone numbers on a bulletin board in a local laundromat and advertised their availability for baby sitting, and both girls had received phone calls from a man; one declined because she was busy, and referred the man to Pamela, who was seen climbing into an automobile at 5:45 that afternoon. Pamela's body was found eight days later along a highway. Edward Coolidge Jr., whose mother had recently purchased the laundromat, would be arrested on February 19, and would be tried and convicted of the crime. The conviction would be set aside in 1971 by the landmark U.S. Supreme Court decision regarding the Fourth Amendment, Coolidge v. New Hampshire. After a Supreme Court ruling that evidence seized from Coolidge's car without a warrant had been improperly admitted, the case would be sent back for a new trial. On December 29, 1971, Coolidge would plead guilty to second degree murder and sentenced immediately to a term of 25 to 40 years in the state penitentiary where he had been incarcerated since 1964.
- All 13 member nations of the Arab League met in Cairo at the invitation of President Gamal Abdel Nasser of Egypt, still referred to at the time as the United Arab Republic. An Israeli historian would later comment that "The summit conference was, without a doubt, one of the more momentous events in the history of the Arab world". The leaders voted to establish three new organizations in preparation for removing the Jewish state of Israel from the Middle East. One was the Palestine Liberation Organization (PLO), which would give the Palestinian people in Israel a role in ridding their homeland of Zionism; another was the United Arab Command to strengthen the military might of all the member nations; and the third was the Jordan River Authority, which would make plans to divert the waters of the Jordan River to prevent its use by Israel.
- A United States Air Force B-52D Stratofortress carrying two Mark 53 nuclear bombs lost its vertical stabilizer in turbulence during a winter storm and crashed on Savage Mountain near Barton, Maryland. Only two of the five crewmen survived. The bombs would be recovered two days later.
- Testing of Gemini spacecraft No. 2 began at McDonnell Aircraft Corporation.

== January 14, 1964 (Tuesday) ==
- The People's Republic of China made a step forward in its nuclear weapons program as its processing facility at Lanzhou made its first delivery of enriched uranium, of which 90% was the uranium-235 necessary for a fission bomb; China would explode its first atomic bomb, a 22-kiloton weapon, on October 16.
- In the 14th National Basketball Association All-Star Game at the Boston Garden, the Eastern Conference defeated the Western Conference 111–107. After arriving in Boston, the 20 players had threatened to stage a walkout if their demands for a player pension plan were not met. It was not until 8:55, five minutes before the nationally televised event was set to begin, that the players emerged from their locker rooms. The Boston Celtics' Tom Heinsohn, one of the East all-star players and president of the NBA players union, conferred with NBA Commissioner J. Walter Kennedy, who pledged that the pension issue would be addressed at the February 18 owners' meeting. The game started only 10 minutes late.
- A partial solar eclipse took place, but was seen only by people who were above the Arctic Circle.
- Born: Dan Schneider, American television producer and actor, in Memphis, Tennessee
- Died: Collins Denny Jr., 64, American segregationist lawyer

== January 15, 1964 (Wednesday) ==
- Representatives of the Greek Cypriots and Turkish Cypriots met in London to begin a multinational peace conference to negotiate a halt to the civil war on the island nation of Cyprus. The mediation team from the United Kingdom was joined by negotiators from the nations of Greece and Turkey, after the parties had agreed to the talks on January 2. The participants in the 16-day conference included many future leaders of Cyprus, with the Greek Cypriots being represented by three future Presidents of Cyprus (Glafcos Clerides, Spyros Kyprianou and Tassos Papadopoulos); the future President of the breakaway Turkish Republic of Northern Cyprus, Rauf Denktash and a future Prime Minister, Osman Örek; the ambassadors to the United Kingdom from Greece (Michel Melas) and Turkey (Zeki Kuneralp); Turkish Foreign Minister Feridun Erkin; and the moderators, British Secretary of State for the Commonwealth Duncan Sandys and a future Foreign Minister Lord Carrington.
- The collapse of a 12-story apartment building killed 20 construction workers in Paris, a day before a ribbon-cutting ceremony to dedicate a new public housing project. Reportedly, the workers "were putting the last prefabricated steel and concrete beams in place" on the building on Boulevard Lefebvre in the 15th arrondissement, Vaugirard. The accident would later be traced to the site manager's decision to remove temporary metal bracing from the incomplete structure in order to use the braces elsewhere. An author would later note that "This landmark accident marked a significant shift in attitudes toward building site safety", and before the end of the year, the French government would introduce the first major reforms in more than 50 years.
- The United States Post Office Department announced that it would drop the long-standing practice of indicating the time of day as part of the cancellation of a piece of mail, effective February 1, 1964. Instead of having the time (within the nearest one-half hour) that a letter was received for delivery, the new stamp would merely indicate A.M. or P.M. to show whether it was received in the morning or afternoon.
- Phase I of development of the Gemini drogue parachute began with a successful test drop of boilerplate spacecraft No. 5 at El Centro, California, to determine the effects of deploying the pilot chute by a lanyard attached to the drogue chute. Phase I would be successfully concluded on April 21 with the fifth and final drop.
- Following completion of studies of an extended Apollo program system at Manned Spacecraft Center (MSC), NASA gave the go-ahead to MSC for Phase II, with two separate contracts to industry for study of the Apollo command and service module.
- Died:
  - Tawfiq Canaan, 81, pioneering physician, medical researcher, ethnographer and Palestinian nationalist
  - George Duncan, 80, Scottish professional golfer
  - Noro Morales, 53, Puerto Rican pianist and bandleader, died of uremia.
  - Jack Teagarden, 58, American jazz trombonist, died from a heart attack.

== January 16, 1964 (Thursday) ==
- Dr. Charles Dotter of the University of Oregon pioneered the science of interventional radiology by using x-rays to guide placement of instruments in what was also the first percutaneous transluminal angioplasty and the beginning of today's minimally-invasive surgery. Dr. Dotter's patient was an unidentified 83-year-old woman who had been admitted for gangrene of her three left toes and who had refused amputation; with the assistance of Dr Melvin Judkins, Dr. Dotter inserted two Teflon catheters to guide the dilation of the patient's narrowed left popliteal artery under local anesthesia and the patient soon "became ambulatory and her foot promptly healed."
- At the conclusion of a summit meeting in Cairo, the heads of state of 13 Arab nations announced that they would divert the three main tributaries of the Jordan River away from Israel, rather than to go to war or to allow the National Water Carrier of Israel to go into operation as planned. The Israeli project, for the increased use of the waters of the Jordan for agricultural and drinking water needs, had been announced on December 11, to go into operation in the summer. The crisis would finally be resolved on May 5 when the Arab nations dropped objections to Israel's announcement of completion of the project.
- The new government of Zanzibar arrested U.S. Consul Frederick Picard, and another American diplomat, Donald K. Petterson, on the orders of President Abeid Karume, as well as six correspondents associated with Time and Newsweek magazines, the New York Times, the New York Herald-Tribune, The Guardian (of Manchester) and The Globe and Mail (of Toronto). The group was released the next day and placed on a plane leaving the country. President Karume was reportedly upset after reading American newspaper reports about the coup.
- On his own initiative, William Chapman Foster, the Director of the United States Arms Control and Disarmament Agency, made his first proposal to Soviet Ambassador Anatoly Dobrynin about the two nations negotiating limitations on their anti-ballistic missiles, a discussion that would lead to the 1972 ABM Treaty.
- The musical Hello, Dolly!, starring Carol Channing as the widow Dolly Levi, began a successful Broadway run, opening in New York City's St. James Theatre with the first of 2,844 performances.
- The nightclub Whisky a Go Go opened on the Sunset Strip in Hollywood, California.
- Born: Chris Dittmar, Australian squash player who was briefly ranked number one in the world (in 1993), and who was five-time runner-up in the World Open; in Adelaide

== January 17, 1964 (Friday) ==
- Charlie and the Chocolate Factory, a children's novel by British author Roald Dahl, was first released in the United States, followed by a UK release on November 23. Originally published by George Allen & Unwin, the book became Roald's most famous work, frequently being ranked among the most popular works in children's literature and has also been adapted into two major motion pictures: Willy Wonka & the Chocolate Factory in 1971 and Charlie and the Chocolate Factory in 2005. It was the inspiration for a third film, Wonka, in 2023.
- John Glenn, the first American to orbit the Earth, announced his candidacy for the Democratic Party nomination for U.S. Senator for Ohio, one day after resigning from the American space program.
- Panama completed its break of diplomatic relations with the United States, ordering the closure of the U.S. Embassy in Panama City and directing all diplomatic personnel to leave.
- Born: Michelle Obama, First Lady of the United States from 2009 to 2017 and wife to former president Barack Obama; as Michelle LaVaughn Robinson in Chicago
- Died: T. H. White, 57, English novelist known for The Once and Future King and The Sword in the Stone, died from heart failure while aboard ship in Piraeus, Greece, while preparing to travel to the United States.

== January 18, 1964 (Saturday) ==
- A scale model of the new, 16-acre (6.5 ha) World Trade Center was unveiled to the public at a press conference in New York City, hosted by the governors of New York and New Jersey (Nelson A. Rockefeller and Richard J. Hughes) and the mayors of New York City and Jersey City (Robert F. Wagner and Thomas J. Whelan). The most outstanding feature for the proposed complex, which would be located on the lower West Side of Manhattan, was its "twin towers" designed by architect Minoru Yamasaki, each 110 stories tall; with a 222-foot (68 m) tall transmitting tower on its roof, Tower One would be 1,472 feet (449 m) high, replacing the Empire State Building as the tallest building in the world.
- MS Empress of Australia, the world's largest passenger ferry, was launched from the Cockatoo Island Dockyard in Sydney, and was christened by Catherine Sidney, the daughter of Australia's Governor-General, William Sidney. Weighing more than 12,000 tonnes (12,000 long tons; 13,000 short tons) and 445 feet (136 m) long, the Empress could carry 41 cars, 33 commercial trucks, and numerous shipping containers on its deck, and had room for 250 passengers.
- Fabulous 208, a weekly pop music magazine aimed at British teenagers, published its first issue. During its first two years, it was called Fabulous, and from 1975 until its demise in 1980, it was named Fab 80. Initially, each issue sold for one shilling and included 12 "pin-ups" of current rock stars.
- An earthquake struck Taiwan, killing at least 40 people and injuring more than 200. The collapse of buildings in and around Tainan killed 32 people, and the tremors at Chiayi were exacerbated by a fire from overturned charcoal stoves.
- Born: Jane Horrocks, English television actress; in Rawtenstall, Lancashire

== January 19, 1964 (Sunday) ==
- About 700 members of the 1st Battalion of the Tanganyika Rifles mutinied against their white British Army officers and briefly took control of the Tanganyikan capital, Dar es Salaam. According to Tanzanian records, the mutineers wanted higher pay and African officers to replace their British commanders; the uprising began at the Colito Barracks in Lugalo and then was joined by units at Tabora and Nachingwea. The rebels arrested 30 of their British officers, built roadblocks to stop entry and exit at Dar es Salaam, took control of the airport, the radio station, the railway station, and police stations, as well as the State House, the office of President Julius Nyerere (although Nyerere was not there at the time). Thirty people were killed during the brief insurrection, but the mutineers (who had no plans to operate their own government) freed the British officers after Defense Minister Oscar Kambona acceded to their demands. The British commanders were flown out of the country, and British troops were asked to maintain order until Nigerian troops could replace them.
- A referendum on rejecting the constitution of Swaziland took place in the British colony (and southern African kingdom) after being called by King Sobhuza II. The Swazi constitution had been imposed by British administrators two weeks earlier, and the vote was purely advisory, and took place without endorsement or supervision by the United Kingdom. The official results showing 124,380 votes cast in spite of a boycott by British supporters "indicated that 102 percent of the voting-age population had participated" and showed 124,218 for rejection and only 162 votes against the British colonial office ignored the "somewhat surrealistic" figures.
- Born: Ricardo Arjona, Guatemalan singer and songwriter; in Jocotenango
- Died:
  - Joe Weatherly, 41, the defending NASCAR Grand National champion, was killed at the Riverside International Raceway in California when his car skidded into a retaining wall on the 76th lap of the Motor Trend 500. Weatherly had taken a difficult turn at 100 miles per hour (160 km/h), leading to speculation that his accelerator had gotten stuck.
  - Firmin Lambot, 77, Belgian racing cyclist

== January 20, 1964 (Monday) ==
- Henry Cabot Lodge Jr., the U.S. Ambassador to South Vietnam, sent President Johnson a report by Giovanni D'Orlandi, the Italian Ambassador, suggesting that Tran Van Don and Ngo Dinh Diem were potential leaders of a group that might attempt to assassinate French President Charles de Gaulle.
- Meet the Beatles!, the first Beatles album from Capitol Records in the United States, was released ten days after Chicago's Vee-Jay Records released Introducing... The Beatles. The two record companies would battle it out in court for months, eventually coming to a settlement.
- Nineteen men went on trial at Buckinghamshire Assizes for the Great Train Robbery carried out on August 8 at a railway bridge at Ledburn in the United Kingdom.
- Martin-Baltimore conducted a static test-to-failure of the Gemini spacecraft/Titan rocket interface structure, in advance of the Gemini 1 mission.
- Swahili was made the new official language of Zanzibar, replacing English.

== January 21, 1964 (Tuesday) ==
- Hans Krüger, West Germany's Minister for Displaced Persons, Refugees and War Victims since October 17, was placed on administrative leave by Chancellor Ludwig Erhard after the weekly news magazine Der Spiegel revealed that Krüger had been a Nazi war criminal. As the Reich's administrator for the town of Chojnice in German-occupied Poland during World War II, Krüger had overseen the execution of local residents; by February 7, he would be replaced.
- During preparations for the 1964 Winter Olympics in Innsbruck, Austria, British luge slider Kazimierz Kay-Skrzypecki was critically injured in a crash during a training run. He would die in surgery the following day, the first of two competitors to lose their lives while training in Innsbruck prior to the Games.
- President Léon M'ba of Gabon dissolved the African nation's legislature as an "economy measure". The assembly of 67 legislators still had two years remaining on their terms.
- Died:
  - Joseph Schildkraut, 67, Austrian-born American stage and film actor, winner of 1937 Academy Award for Best Supporting Actor for The Life of Emile Zola.
  - Luis Martín-Santos, 39, Spanish psychiatrist and writer, was killed in a car accident.

== January 22, 1964 (Wednesday) ==
- The U.S. Joint Chiefs of Staff sent a classified memorandum to U.S. Defense Secretary Robert S. McNamara, urging an expansion of U.S. involvement in the Vietnam War, advocating heavy bombing of North Vietnam, and deployment of troops in South Vietnam for an eventual invasion of the North.
- U.S. President Lyndon B. Johnson and Canada's Prime Minister Lester B. Pearson signed an agreement at the White House, establishing the jointly-operated Roosevelt Campobello International Park at the former summer home of the late President Franklin Roosevelt in New Brunswick.
- In its first public violation of the 1959 requirement for all aircraft operating from the aircraft carrier Minas Gerais to belong to the Brazilian Air Force, the Brazilian Navy steamed Minas Gerais into Guanabara Bay at Rio de Janeiro with four navy T-28 Trojan trainers on her flight deck.
- Kenneth Kaunda was inaugurated as the first Prime Minister of Northern Rhodesia, now Zambia.
- North American Aviation began deployment flights of its Paraglider Landing System vehicle. The contract called for 20 tests to demonstrate deployment of the full-scale wing from the Gemini reentry module, followed by glide and radio-controlled maneuvering. Tests would continue until December 1, 1964, with successful demonstration of the complete test sequence with no problems.
- Born: Nigel Benn, British world super-middleweight boxing champion (1992–96); in Ilford
- Died:
  - Marc Blitzstein, 58, American composer, was fatally beaten during a robbery while on vacation in Martinique. He had attempted a sexual encounter with a merchant sailor the previous evening. Blitzstein was able to make his way to the public square, taken to a hospital, and asked the U.S. vice-consul to inform his family and the press that he had been injured in an auto accident. He then died from a ruptured liver.
  - Kazimierz Kay-Skrzypecki, 58, Polish-born British Olympic luge slider, died in surgery at a hospital in Innsbruck, the day after his injuries in practice at the 1964 Winter Olympics.

== January 23, 1964 (Thursday) ==
- The South Dakota Senate voted, 34–0, to ratify the Twenty-fourth Amendment to the United States Constitution, prohibiting the use of poll taxes in elections for federal office. In so doing, South Dakota became the necessary 38th of the 50 states to make the amendment effective, since approval by at least three-fourths of the states was necessary to amend the U.S. Constitution. The amendment would subsequently be ratified by Virginia (1977), North Carolina (1989), Alabama (2002) and Texas (2009), but eight states did not ratify it after it became effective, including Mississippi (which voted to reject ratification in 1962), and Arkansas (which still had a poll tax law, but did not enforce it).
- The Museum of History and Technology, now referred to as the National Museum of American History, opened in Washington adjacent to the Smithsonian Institution. On the first Sunday after the opening, more than 57,000 people visited the new museum, and more than 2,510,672 had visited by June 30.
- Arthur Miller's After the Fall opened on Broadway. A semi-autobiographical work, it generated controversy over his portrayal of his ex-wife, the late Marilyn Monroe.
- In Jakarta, Indonesian and Malaysian leaders agreed to a ceasefire, mediated by U.S. Attorney General Robert F. Kennedy.
- Pope Paul VI instituted the World Day of Prayer for Vocations.
- Born: Mariska Hargitay, American television actress and Emmy Award and Golden Globe winner; in Santa Monica, California, the daughter of Jayne Mansfield and Mickey Hargitay

== January 24, 1964 (Friday) ==
- Several hundred soldiers of the 11th battalion of the Kenya Rifles mutinied at their base in Lanet, near the city of Nakuru, and arrested the British officers within the unit. The rebellion was put down by the next day, however, because there were 5,000 troops from the British Army who were stationed elsewhere in Kenya and came in at the request of President Jomo Kenyatta. Afterward, 43 of the Kenyan rebels were court-martialed, 16 of whom were sentenced to prison terms averaging 12 years, and the 11th battalion was disbanded.
- Mohieddin Fikini was fired from his position as Prime Minister of Libya and his other responsibilities as Libya's Foreign Minister, after a clash with the Cyrenaica Defense Force commander, General Mahmud Buguaitin over the killing of student protesters. King Idris I refused to fire Buguaitin, whom he valued as a loyal friend.
- The Military Assistance Command, Vietnam – Studies and Observations Group (MACSOC) was secretly established by the United States to conduct covert unconventional warfare operations prior to and during the Vietnam War.

== January 25, 1964 (Saturday) ==
- The United States launched the Echo 2 satellite, a rigid mylar and aluminum balloon, into orbit. Once achieving an altitude of 800 miles (1,300 km), the balloon emerged from the nose of the Thor-Agena B rocket and expanded to a diameter of 135 feet (41 m). By an agreement with the Soviet Union on August 1, 1963, NASA kept the Soviet space agency apprised of launch status and orbital elements, and the two nations conducted "cooperative experiments" in sending signals off of Echo 2 and tracking the satellite. At nearly 130,000 cubic feet (almost 37,000 cubic meters), Echo 2 was the largest man-made object ever placed into orbit. It was also the first man-made object that could be seen directly by billions of people, since its orbit took it over most of the world's nations and it was visible to the naked eye. After almost five and a half years, Echo 2's orbit would decay and it would be destroyed upon atmospheric re-entry on June 7, 1969.
- For the second time in a week, British troops intervened to stop mutinies in East Africa. In addition to a second mutiny in Tanganyika, similar mutinies by national troops against British officers took place in Kenya and Uganda. Tanganyika's President Julius Nyerere disarmed his troops. The aircraft carrier HMS Centaur (R06) landed troops at Tanganyika from the 45 Commando unit of the Royal Marines and provided air cover, while the destroyer HMS Cambrian (R85) made a "gunfire demonstration"; within 40 minutes, rebels at the Colito base surrendered, and within 24 hours, the amphibious force had secured the island, "an area the size of the UK, with a population of 6 million, for the cost of only four rebels killed and seven wounded."
- The West German game show Einer wird gewinnen (German for "One will win"), popular in the 1960s and 1980s, began on television on Norddeutscher Rundfunk. The quiz show was unique in that its eight contestants were drawn from eight European nations and were assisted by interpreters as needed. The show's initials, "EWG", coincided with Europäische Wirtschaftsgemeinschaft, the German name for the European Economic Community.
- Blue Ribbon Sports was incorporated by Phil Knight, a former track and field athlete at the University of Oregon, and his coach, Bill Bowerman, to market its special brand, "Tiger Shoes" for runners. In 1971, the company would change its name to Nike, Inc., now the world's largest manufacturer of sports apparel.
- General Christophe Soglo stepped aside as President of Dahomey (now Benin) and appointed former prime minister Sourou-Migan Apithy as the new head of state. Apithy, a former prime minister and vice-president, would serve until November 29, 1965.
- Pope Paul VI issued a motu proprio, on his own initiative, titled Sacrosanctum Concilum, elaborating on what portions of the Roman Catholic mass could be conducted in a language other than Latin.
- In Indonesia, Serbuni trade unionists occupied the Unilever factory in Surabaya, but were evicted by police.
- Rocketdyne tested a Gemini orbit attitude and maneuver system (OAMS) 100-pound-force (440 N) thrust chamber assembly (TCA) to the 757-second mission duty cycle without failure.
- Gemini Project Office reported that Ames Research Center had confirmed that reentry attitude control of the spacecraft using the horizon view alone was well within astronaut capabilities.
- Died: Ross Milne, 19, Australian Olympic Alpine skier, was killed at Innsbruck, where he was preparing to compete in the Winter Olympics.

== January 26, 1964 (Sunday) ==
- The annual telecasts of The Wizard of Oz in the United States resumed. Although the classic film had not been shown in 1963, the delay between broadcasts had been only a little more than a year, with the previous telecast having been December 9, 1962.
- Indonesian Air Force airplanes dropped thousands of leaflets on the island of Borneo along the nation's border with Malaysia, each containing an order from President Sukarno directing Indonesian Army troops in the jungle to obey a cease-fire order.

== January 27, 1964 (Monday) ==
- France and China announced simultaneously in Paris and Beijing that "The Government of the People's Republic of China and the Government of the French Republic have decided in mutual agreement to establish diplomatic relations. For this purpose, the two Governments have agreed to exchange ambassadors within three months." France, however, declined to sever diplomatic relations with Taiwan. The French Foreign Ministry had notified U.S. Ambassador Charles Bohlen of its intent on January 15, but the French and Chinese governments avoided any official statement for 12 days, despite the administration's protest.
- Mary Whitehouse and her friend Norah Buckland launched the "Clean Up TV" (CUTV) campaign against Great Britain's television networks in a meeting attended by 2,000 supporters at the Birmingham Town Hall. Along with their husbands, they would create the National Viewers' and Listeners' Association (now Mediawatch-UK). Mrs. Whitehouse was an art teacher in the town of Madeley, Shropshire, and had been assigned to teach sex education to students; she was appalled at the values that the schoolchildren were learning from BBC and ITV programming, and became a social activist.
- The U.S. Federal Aviation Administration announced the three competing designs submitted to it by airplane manufacturers for a supersonic passenger airliner. Boeing's proposal, the Boeing 733, proposed to carry 150 passengers at a speed of Mach 2.7; Lockheed Corporation offered the Lockheed L-2000 that would carry 218 passengers at Mach 3.0; and North American Aviation presented the North American NAC-60 to take 167 passengers at Mach 2.65.
- U.S. Senator Margaret Chase Smith of Maine announced her candidacy for the Republican presidential nomination, becoming "the first woman to be taken seriously for the White House". Smith would run in the New Hampshire and Illinois primaries before dropping out of the campaign, and would earn 27 delegates to the GOP convention.
- Born: Bridget Fonda, American film and television actress; in Los Angeles, to actor Peter Fonda and his wife Susan Fonda
- Died:
  - Waite Phillips, 81, American oil executive and philanthropist
  - Norman Z. McLeod, 65, American film director

== January 28, 1964 (Tuesday) ==
- Three U.S. Air Force officers — Lt. Col. Gerald K. Hannaford, Captain John F. Lorraine and Captain Donald G. Millard — were killed after their T-39 Sabreliner was shot down in East Germany by a Soviet MiG-19 fighter. The crew of the T-39 had taken off from the Wiesbaden Air Base at 2:00 in the afternoon in poor weather, and had strayed off course an hour later. According to Soviet reports, the U.S. jet ignored signals to land after penetrating 55 miles (89 km) into East Germany, and was downed by machine gun and cannon fire. The plane struck a hill one mile outside the East German village of Vogelsberg.
- The fledgling American Football League received a financial boost when the NBC television network signed a contract to pay the eight-team circuit $36,000,000 for the exclusive broadcast rights for AFL games for five seasons. AFL Commissioner Joe Foss noted that the agreement would provide the league more TV revenue in a single year than it had received during its first four seasons from the ABC television network.
- The International Olympic Committee voted, 27–24, to award the 1968 Winter Olympics to Grenoble in France, rather than Calgary in Canada. The vote came on the third round, after the IOC eliminated Sapporo, Japan; Oslo, Norway; and Lake Placid, New York of the United States; on the second round, Calgary had a 19–18 lead over Grenoble in a three-way race that saw 14 votes go to included Lahti in Sweden.
- A group of 12 Nationalist Chinese soldiers in Taiwan carried out the massacre of about 200 prisoners from the Communist mainland's People's Volunteer Army, in an apparent retaliation for the December attack on a Taiwanese village the previous month.

== January 29, 1964 (Wednesday) ==
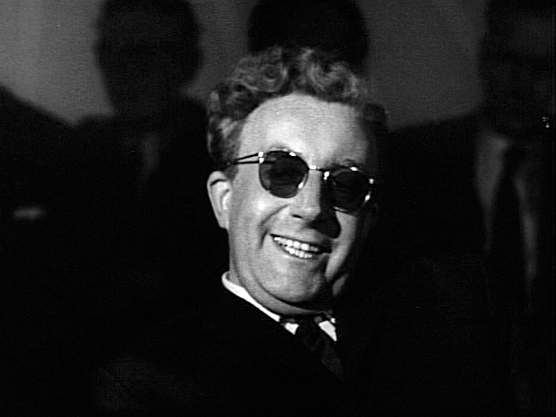
Peter Sellers as Dr. Strangelove

- The film Dr. Strangelove (subtitled How I Learned to Stop Worrying and Love the Bomb) opened in select U.S. theaters. Along with four other movies "dealing with fictitious presidents of the United States", advance publicity and the release had been put on hold after the assassination of John F. Kennedy the previous November 22. The others were the similarly themed Fail Safe, and the comedy Kisses for My President (about the first female U.S. president); the drama Seven Days in May; and the drama The Best Man.

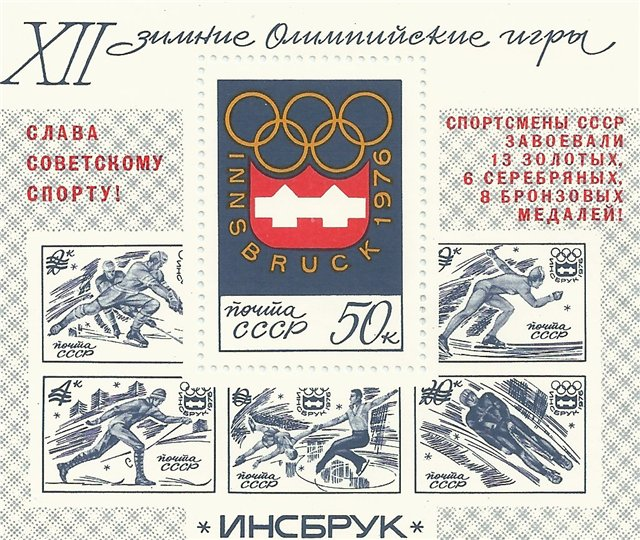
Soviet Olympic commemorative stamp

- The 1964 Winter Olympics opened in Innsbruck, Austria. After 1,350 athletes from 36 nations paraded past the Bergisel ski jump, Austrian skier Josef Rieder (who had won the 1958 World Championships in skiing but who never won an Olympic medal) lit the Olympic torch, and Austrian President Adolf Schärf declared the games open.
- The United States demonstrated that it could launch a rocket competitive with those of the Soviet Union, as the Saturn I SA-5 placed a satellite weighing 37,700 pounds (17,100 kg) into orbit, the heaviest payload carried into space up to that time. President Johnson commented that the successful orbit "proved we have the capability of putting great payloads into space", while Marshall Space Flight Center director Wernher von Braun said, "We are now ahead of the Russians in cargo carrying ability." The satellite was actually the second stage of the Saturn 1 rocket (the S-IV), described as "mostly deadweight with a radio beacon for tracking purposes", but it was more than twice as heavy as the previous record holders, the Soviet Sputnik VII and Sputnik VIII satellites, which had weighed 14,292 pounds (6,483 kg). The weight of the payload included 11,600 pounds (5,300 kg) of Florida sand to provide ballast to the Saturn rocket's nose cone.
- Born: Andre Reed, American NFL wide receiver and member of the Pro Football Hall of Fame; in Allentown, Pennsylvania
- Died:
  - Alan Ladd, 50, American film star known for Shane and This Gun for Hire, was found dead in his apartment, after having ingested sleeping pills and alcohol.
  - Adolfo Díaz, 88, President of Nicaragua from 1911 to 1917 and again from 1926 to 1929

== January 30, 1964 (Thursday) ==
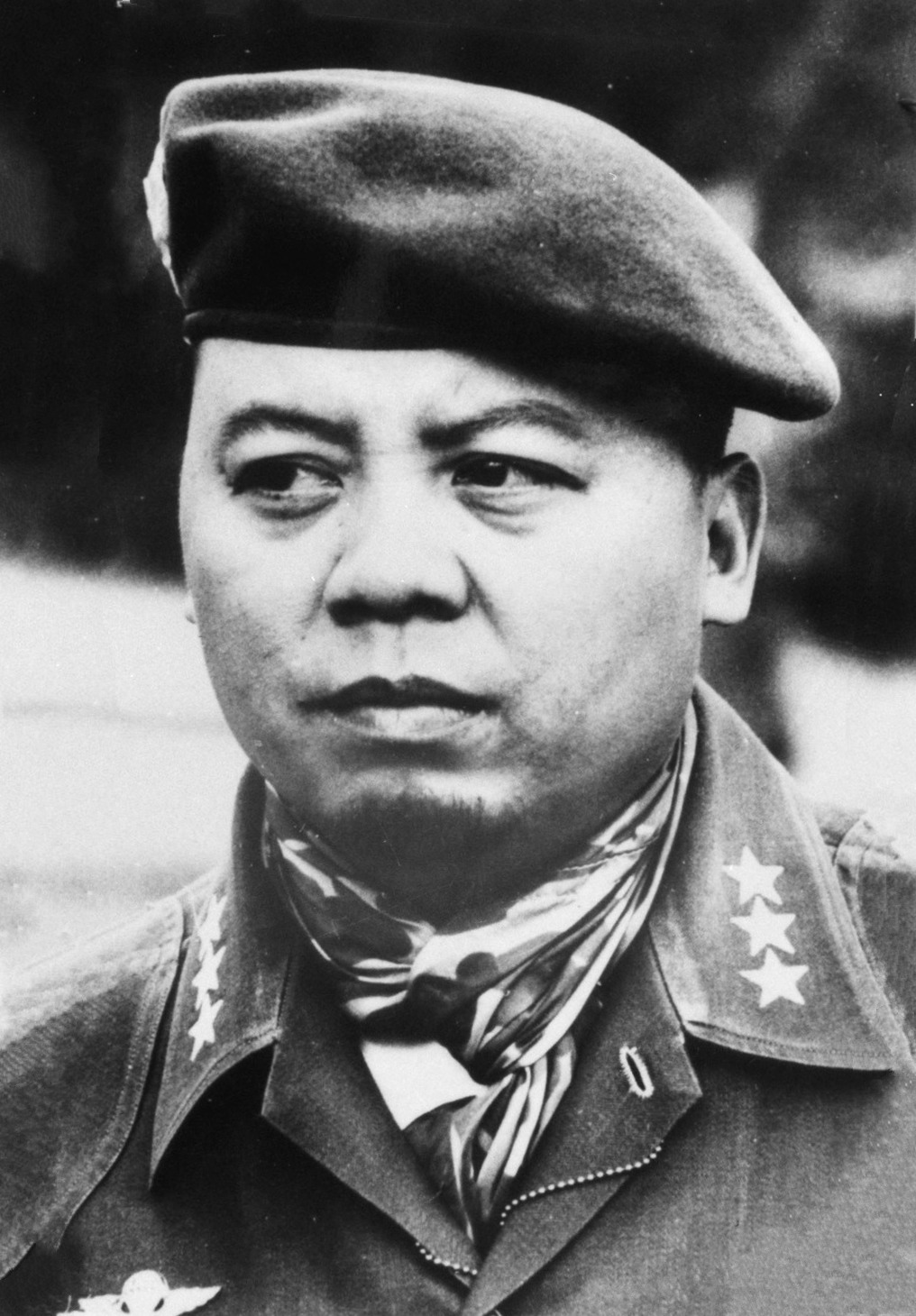
Khanh

- General Nguyen Khanh led a bloodless military coup d'état, replacing Dương Văn Minh as President of South Vietnam. The coup came less than three months after the bloody coup of November 2, in which President Ngo Dinh Diem had been assassinated. Khanh would allow Duong Van Minh to resume the office of President nine days later, and place himself in the role of prime minister.
- The Soviet Union launched two scientific satellites, Elektron I and Elektron II, from a single rocket, placing each into a different orbit. According to the announcement by the Soviet news agency, TASS, Elektron I ranged from 252 miles (406 km) to 4,410 miles (7,100 km) above the Earth, while Elektron II had an oblong orbit with a perigee of 285 miles (459 km) and an apogee of 42,352 miles (68,159 km).
- The United States launched Ranger 6 from Cape Kennedy at 10:49 a.m., on a mission to carry television cameras equipped to take 3,000 detailed photographs of the lunar surface before its expected crash-landing on the Moon.
- The United States Senate passed President Johnson's proposed tax cut, 77 to 21, and the reduction in taxes would be signed into law on February 26.

== January 31, 1964 (Friday) ==
- At the Brookhaven National Laboratory in Upton, New York, a team of 31 particle physicists led by Nicholas P. Samios discovered the first evidence of the existence of the Omega minus particle (Ω^{−}) that had been postulated in 1961 by Murray Gell-Mann and Yuval Ne'eman. The Ω^{−}, located in one of more than 50,000 bubble chamber photographs, was the first of the subatomic Omega baryons to be confirmed, and "broke the temporary monopoly of particle discoveries" held by the Lawrence Berkeley National Lab team led by Dr. Luis Alvarez in California.
- Voting was conducted in the referendum to amend the Constitution of Ghana, with results that suggested overwhelming approval for amendments to make Kwame Nkrumah "President for Life" with dictatorial powers, and to eliminate all political parties except for Nkrumah's Convention People's Party. The official numbers, described as "brought to a pitch by absurdity", were 2,377,920 in favor, and only 2,452 against, for a 99.91% approval of the amendment.
- The rent strike in the slums of the Harlem neighborhood in New York City reached its peak, with 50,000 tenants in 525 buildings refusing to pay rent until housing conditions improved. The strike had started with three buildings in November and had reached 167 by the end of 1963. In March, the number of participants would begin to steadily decline as tenant groups failed in court.
- President Johnson asked the U.S. Congress to make the pilot Food Stamp Program permanent and nationwide; the Food Stamp Act of 1964 would be enacted into law in August.
- Born: Jeff Hanneman, American heavy metal musician and founding member of the thrash metal band Slayer; in Oakland, California (d. 2013)
- Died:
  - Louis Allen, 44, an African-American businessman who owned his own logging business, was murdered at his home in Amite County, Mississippi, after having cooperated with an FBI investigation. Nobody was ever charged with his death.
  - Nguyễn Văn Nhung, 44, South Vietnamese military officer involved in the military coup three months earlier, was killed the day after the 1964 countercoup, apparently on orders of the coup leader, General Nguyen Khanh.
