= December 1963 =

Month of 1963

<<	December 1963					>>
Su	Mo	Tu	We	Th	Fr	Sa
1	2	3	4	5	6	7
8	9	10	11	12	13	14
15	16	17	18	19	20	21
22	23	24	25	26	27	28
29	30	31

The following events occurred in December 1963:

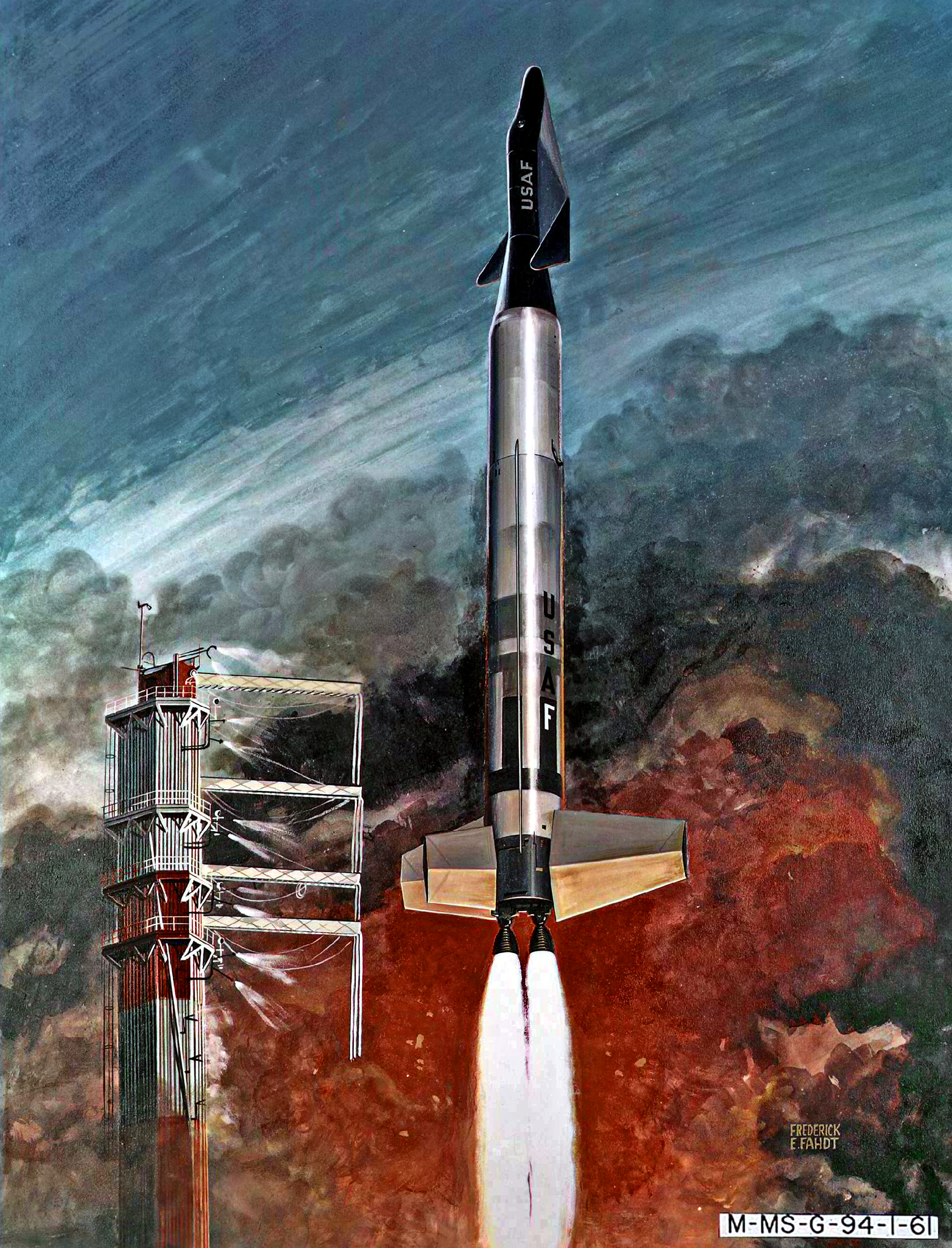
December 10, 1963: U.S. Dyna-Soar project cancelled

December 12, 1963: Kenya is granted independence

== December 1, 1963 (Sunday) ==
- Malcolm X described the Kennedy assassination as a case of America's "chickens coming home to roost", resulting in his suspension on December 4, and eventual excommunication from the Nation of Islam.
- Wendell Scott became the first African-American driver to win a NASCAR race, finishing in first place at Speedway Park in Jacksonville, Florida for the third race of the 1964 Grand National Series.
- In voting in Senegal, incumbent president Léopold Sédar Senghor of the Senegalese Progressive Union was elected unopposed, and his party won all 80 seats with 94.2% of the vote.
- In the Venezuelan presidential election, Raúl Leoni of the Democratic Action party defeated Rafael Caldera and five other challengers.
- Foreign Minister Auguste Mabika-Kalinda of the former Belgian Congo was arrested.
- Nagaland became the 16th state of India.
- Born:
  - Arjuna Ranatunga, Sri Lankan cricketer and politician; in Gampaha
  - Pete Astudillo, American singer and songwriter; in Laredo, Texas

== December 2, 1963 (Monday) ==
- What has been called "the first mixed martial arts match of the modern age" took place in Salt Lake City, Utah, when judo champion and professional wrestler Gene LeBell accepted a challenge to fight light heavyweight boxer Milo Savage, who was ranked fifth in the world at the time. LeBell, responding to a $1,000 challenge that no judo practitioner could defeat a boxer in a fight, defeated Savage in the fourth round by choking him and rendering him unconscious. The match itself, staged before 1,500 people, was billed as a "boxer vs. judo man" program.
- Public schools in Prince Edward County, Virginia, remained closed for the fourth year in a row, after the United States Court of Appeals for the Fourth Circuit reversed a District Court ruling in Griffin v. County School Board of Prince Edward County that the county had to fund public education. In 1959, the county board of education had closed its separate black and white schools rather than comply with an order to desegregate.
- Died: Tashi Namgyal, 70, 11th Chogyal of Sikkim and ruler of the Namgyal dynasty of Sikkim since 1914. His second son, Palden Thondup Namgyal, succeeded him as Chogyal.

== December 3, 1963 (Tuesday) ==
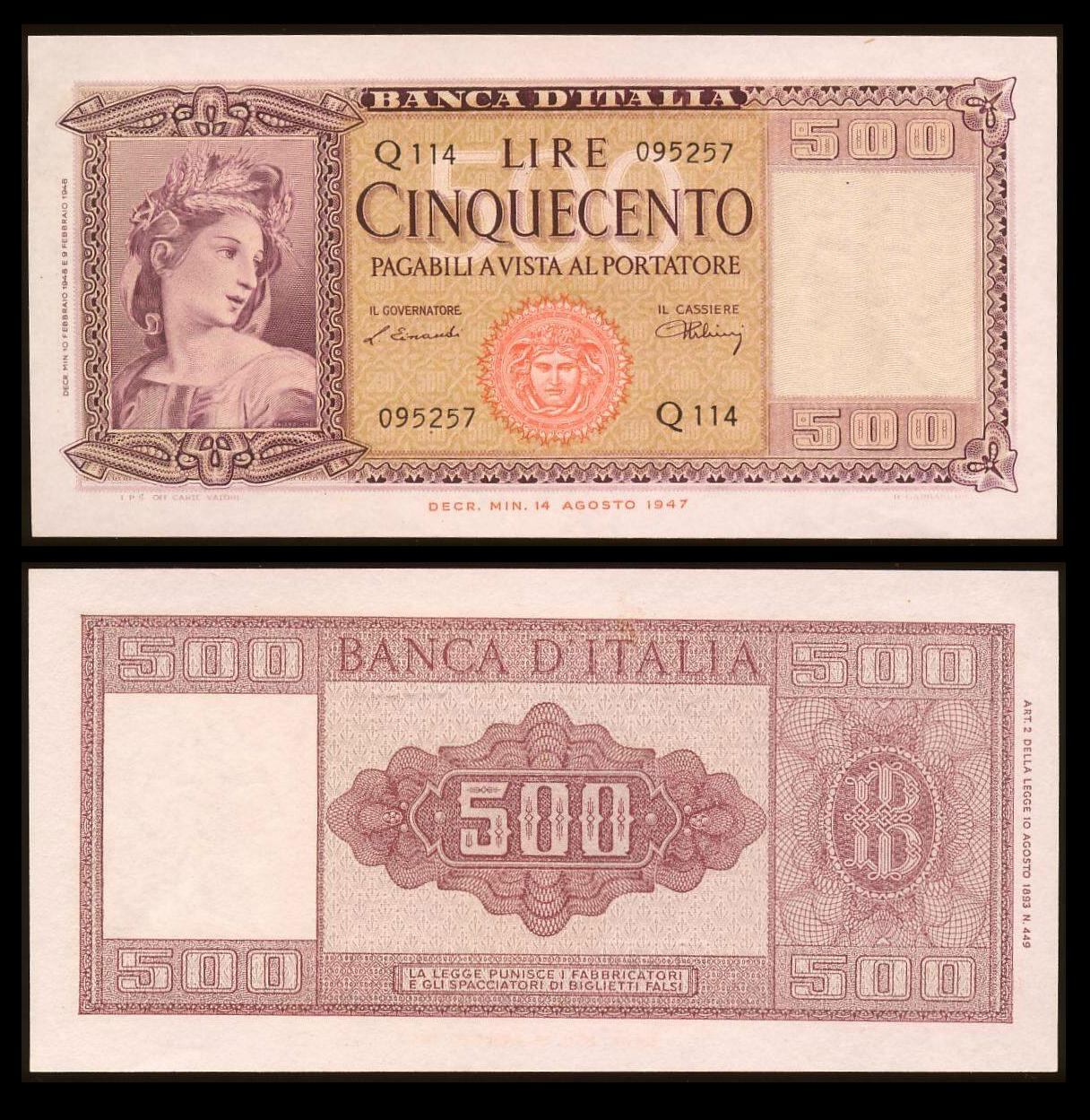
The old 10" x 5" Italian lira

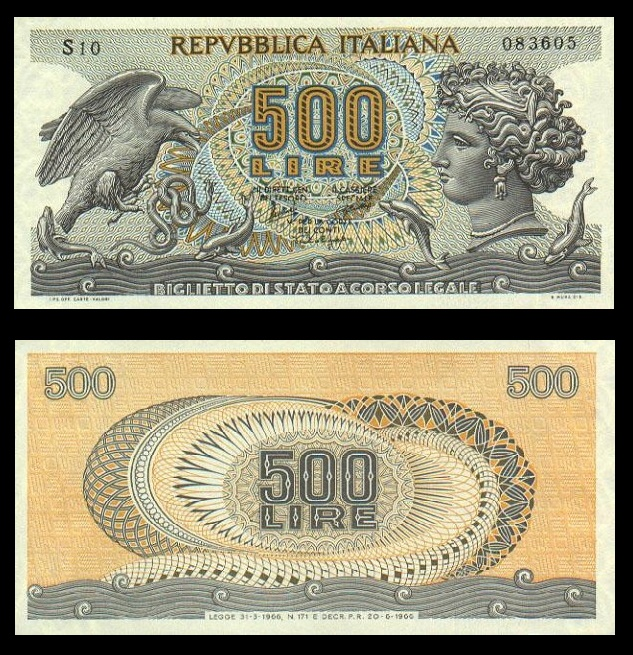
The new smaller 6" x 3" lira

The original 10" x 5" lira compared to the replacement 6" x 3" lira, to scale
- Italy reduced the size of its paper currency by 40%. The old lira had been referred to as "bed sheet" size because each bill was almost 25 cm by 12.5 cm (almost 10 inches long by five inches wide). The new size of the lira, 15 centimeters by 7.5 centimeters (almost six inches by three inches) was a little more than one-third as large in total area, and closer in size to other world currencies.
- The Gemini Program Planning Board acknowledged the need to fix Titan II rocket deficiencies before a launch could be made, including problems related to longitudinal oscillations, combustion instability, and engine improvement.
- Died:
  - Maurice Baker, 35, a former Dallas policeman, was found shot to death in his apartment in the Oak Cliff neighborhood, apparently having committed suicide. Some conspiracy theorists cite the death as suspicious because Baker lived on the same street where Lee Harvey Oswald lived and was a friend of Jack Ruby.
  - U.S. Army Captain Michael D. Groves, 27, died only eight days after directing the Honor Guard at the funeral of President Kennedy. According to a UPI report, Captain Groves "died unexpectedly... while dining with his family" at his home in Fort Myer, Virginia.

== December 4, 1963 (Wednesday) ==
- The second period of Second Vatican Council ("Vatican II") closed, exactly 400 years to the day after the closing of the Council of Trent on December 4, 1563. When the Sacrosanctum Concilium, the proposed reform of Roman Catholic liturgy, was placed before the Council Fathers, the vote was 2,147 to 4 in favor. As one commentator would note later, "Ritual conformity to language, postures and gestures in liturgical celebrations... yielded to a new way of commemorating the mysteries of salvation history. Latin gave way to the vernacular; altars were turned around, and priest celebrants faced their congregations. The congregation that attended mass in a passive and generally silent manner was transformed into a fully active and conscious assembly which celebrated the liturgy. In short, the content and form of ritual worship in the Roman Catholic Church were considerably modified and corrected." Another commentator would opine that it "also affected, directly and indirectly, worship in most mainstream Western Protestant churches."
- Malcolm X was suspended from the Nation of Islam (Black Muslim) movement by Elijah Muhammad. The 90-day suspension came after Malcolm's earlier remarks about the Kennedy assassination; at the end of the suspension, Malcolm would announce that he was leaving the Black Muslim movement entirely.
- Christophe Soglo, the military officer who took control of Dahomey in a coup d'état two months earlier, forced the resignation of former president Hubert Maga from the provisional government, accusing Maga of involvement in an assassination attempt.
- Following the death of Sergei Korolev, the Soviet space program created the Soyuz crewed space program, returning to the goal of being the first nation to place a man on the Moon.
- The United Nations Security Council unanimously (11 to 0) adopted Resolution 182 condemning the apartheid policy of the Government of the Republic of South Africa.
- In Lemont, Illinois, the Argonne National Laboratory put its new "zero gradient synchrotron" into operation, which was described as opening a "new era in physics".
- Born: Sergey Bubka, Ukrainian pole-vaulter who has held the record for the highest vault (5.81 m (19 ft 3/4 in)) since 1984; in Voroshilovgrad (now Luhansk), Ukrainian SSR, Soviet Union

== December 5, 1963 (Thursday) ==
- Colonel Leuang Kongvongsa, the director of the Deuxiemme Bureau, intelligence agency for the government of Laos, was ambushed while driving home from work. Leuang was driving on a dirt road leading to his house on the outskirts of Vientiane when the assassins' jeeps blocked his way from in front and from behind, and then shot him to death, in the fifth political assassination of the year. Colonel Leuang, who was hit by 15 bullets from a Thompson submachine gun, had been ambushed on orders from General Kouprasith Abhay.
- Aldo Moro was sworn in as Prime Minister of Italy for the first time, marking the return to government for the first time, since 1947, of several political parties, the Christian Democrats, Italian Social Democratic Party, Italian Republican Party and Italian Socialist Party. The first Moro coalition would last seven uneasy months, and would pass the tax on the financial returns, before being brought down by an economic crisis. The new government would be approved by the Chamber of Deputies on December 17.
- The Federal Bureau of Investigation (FBI) completed its investigation of the assassination of President John F. Kennedy less than two weeks after the crime, as Director J. Edgar Hoover approved the final report of the bureau inquiry. The FBI's conclusion was that Lee Harvey Oswald and Jack Ruby had each acted alone, and independently of each other.
- The Seliger Forschungs-und-Entwicklungsgesellschaft mbH demonstrated rockets for military use to military representatives of non-NATO-countries near Cuxhaven. The rockets landed via parachute at the end of their flight and no allied laws were violated, but the Soviet Union protested.
- The Warren Commission met for the first time to begin its investigation into the assassination of United States President John F. Kennedy. At the time, only 29% of Americans thought that the assassin acted alone.
- The principal of Woodland Elementary School in Woodland, Georgia, resigned after it was revealed that students at the school had cheered when they were given the news of the assassination of President Kennedy.
- The bodies of Patrick Bouvier Kennedy and his stillborn sister Arabella were re-interred at Arlington National Cemetery, next to that of their father, President John F. Kennedy.
- Died:
  - Herbert H. Lehman, 85, Governor of New York from 1933 to 1942 and later director-general of the United Nations Relief and Rehabilitation Administration from 1942 to 1946
  - Huseyn Shaheed Suhrawardy, 71, Bengali leader and former Prime Minister of Pakistan from 1956 to 1957
  - Karl Amadeus Hartmann, 58, German classical composer

== December 6, 1963 (Friday) ==
- Two weeks after the assassination of President Kennedy, former First Lady Jacqueline Kennedy, her daughter Caroline and her son John, Jr., moved out of the White House shortly after noon. President Johnson and his wife, Lady Bird Johnson, had agreed that the Kennedy family could have as much time as they needed to pack up their belongings and move to a different home. Mrs. Kennedy and her children then moved into a townhouse in nearby Georgetown, loaned to them by Undersecretary of State W. Averell Harriman. On their last full day in the White House, John Jr.'s birthday party, postponed because November 25 had been the day of his father's funeral, was celebrated. Caroline continued to attend her first grade class with friends at the White House until the end of the year, after which the school was disbanded.
- U.S. Army Corporal Jerry Wayne Parrish became the third American in 19 months to defect to North Korea. Parrish would spend the remaining 34 years of his life in North Korea, and die of kidney disease on August 25, 1998.
- Brian Booth of Australia scored a century in the first test against South Africa at Brisbane.
- Born:
  - Antonella Clerici, Italian host of sport and cooking TV shows; in Legnano
  - Ulrich Thomsen, Danish film actor; in Odense
- Died: Monsignor Alfonso Carinci, 101, Roman Catholic Archbishop and the oldest prelate taking part in the Second Vatican Council

== December 7, 1963 (Saturday) ==
- Tony Verna, a CBS-TV director, made the first use on TV of instant replay during the network's television broadcast of football's annual Army–Navy Game played in Philadelphia. In the fourth quarter, Army quarterback Rollie Stichweh ran for a touchdown. Within seconds, technicians rewound the black and white videotape, then played the recording back on television. Commentator Lindsey Nelson told viewers, "This is not live. Ladies and gentlemen, Army did not score again!" The name "instant replay" would be coined by CBS commentator Pat Summerall during the broadcast of the Cotton Bowl on January 1, 1964. Navy won the game, 21–15.
- Americans got their first glimpse of the new British music group, The Beatles, when a clip of one of their performances (and the enthusiastic support from the British fans) was shown on the CBS Evening News. Radio stations in the U.S. began receiving requests to play Beatles songs, and several began to import copies from the UK.
- The Tokyo District Court issued its ruling in the 1955 lawsuit of Shimoda et al. v. State, brought against Japan by Ryuichi Shimoda and four other survivors of the atomic bombings of Hiroshima and Nagasaki in 1945, and concluded that the United States had violated international law by using the weapons in warfare. The parties had stipulated in advance that neither side would appeal the lower court decision; the Tokyo court based its decision in large part on the fact that both cities were undefended, and that neither target had military significance, and that the bombings were contrary to the principles of international law which prohibit "unnecessary and inhumane pain as a means of injuring the enemy". Nevertheless, the court concluded that the claimants had no legal basis for recovering compensation from the Japanese government. The decision came on the 22nd anniversary of Japan's attack on Pearl Harbor, though the court did not contrast the two in its opinion.
- The government of Iraq decreed that all of its Jewish citizens, whether living at home or abroad, must register as Iraqi Jews within 90 days, or forfeit their citizenship and have their assets confiscated. During the first two years of the decree, the names of more than 400 disenfranchised Jews would be published by the Iraqi press.
- U.S. President Lyndon Johnson, and his wife Lady Bird Johnson, spent their first night in the White House, 15 days after he had been sworn into office.
- Joey Giardello won the world middleweight boxing title in a fight at Atlantic City, New Jersey, defeating champion Dick Tiger in 15 rounds.
- Died:
  - Harry Copeland, 67, one of the original members of John Dillinger's gang of bank robbers, was killed in Detroit after being struck by a drunken driver. Copeland had served 15 years of a 25-year prison sentence for aiding Dillinger in the robbery of the Central National Bank in Greencastle, Indiana, before being released in 1949.
  - Daniel O. Fagunwa, 60, Nigerian Yoruba language novelist

== December 8, 1963 (Sunday) ==
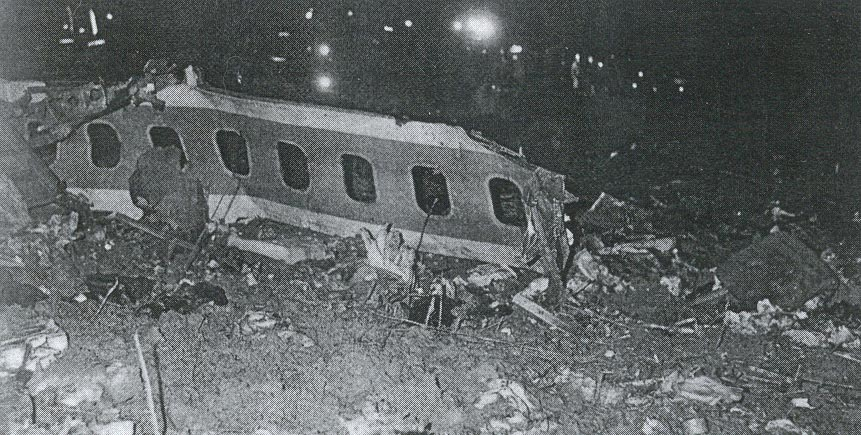
December 8, 1963: Wreckage from the flight after the crash

- All 81 people on Pan Am Flight 214 were killed when the plane exploded after being struck by lightning. The Boeing 707 jet was in a holding pattern at an altitude of 5,000 feet (1,500 m), awaiting clearance to land at Philadelphia, when it was struck at 8:58 pm. The bolt, which struck the airplane's left wing, ignited the mixture of jet fuel and kerosene that was in the reserve fuel tank in the wing, triggering an explosion that ignited the center and right reserve tanks as well. The left wing broke apart, and Flight 214 crashed near Elkton, Maryland, killing the 73 passengers and eight crewmembers. As a result of the disaster, the Federal Aviation Administration would require all passenger jets to install "static discharge wicks" to dissipate the effects of a lightning strike, and to cease further use of the inexpensive mixture (referred to as "JP-4" or "Jet B") in favor of a safer jet fuel.
- Frank Sinatra Jr., the 19-year-old son of the famous singer, was kidnapped from Room 417 at Harrah's Lake Tahoe in Stateline, Nevada. Three men, Barry Keenan, John Irwin and Joe Amsler, entered the room at 9:30 pm, half an hour before the younger Sinatra was to open a show with the Tommy Dorsey band, forced him into their car, and then drugged him and drove him to Canoga Park, California. From there, they called the elder Sinatra and demanded $240,000 ransom. The amount of $239,985 was dropped off in a small suitcase, and the kidnap victim was released, unharmed, on the San Diego Freeway, in the early morning hours of December 11. The three kidnappers would all be released by 1968.
- In a referendum voters in the Republic of the Congo overwhelmingly approved a new constitution that provided for only one political party, the Mouvement national de la révolution (MNR). Three days later, a new National Assembly was elected from a list of MNR candidates. Three days later, parliamentary elections were held with a 91.7% turnout to approve the MNR candidates for the 55 available seats in the National Assembly.
- Eddie Barlow of South Africa scored a century in the first test against Australia at Brisbane.
- Died: Sarit Thanarat, 55, Prime Minister of Thailand since 1959, died of a heart illness. He was succeeded by former premier Thanom Kittikachorn.

== December 9, 1963 (Monday) ==
- For the first time, democratic elections were held in the union territory of Goa, Daman and Diu, which had been Portuguese colonies on the Indian subcontinent until its invasion and annexation by India on December 18, 1961. Nearly 80 percent of the newly enfranchised residents turned out to choose 30 representatives in the local legislature, and two for the Lok Sabha, the lower House of the Parliament of India.
- Born: Empress Masako of Japan; in Tokyo

== December 10, 1963 (Tuesday) ==
- The British government granted independence to Zanzibar shortly after midnight in a ceremony attended by Prince Philip, Duke of Edinburgh, the husband of Queen Elizabeth II. The Union Jack was lowered, the Prince handed the Sultan Jamshid bin Abdullah the grant of independence passed by Act of Parliament, and the new flag of Zanzibar (which would be altered 33 days later) was raised.
- At a news briefing at the Pentagon, U.S. Defense Secretary Robert S. McNamara announced that the X-20 Dyna-Soar reusable spaceplane program was cancelled. Pronounced like "dinosaur" and based on the words "dynamic" and "soarer", the Dyna-Soar had cost over $660 million in research and development even before the first X-20 plane could be produced. The research, however, contributed to the later development of the Space Shuttle program. McNamara stated that money and resources saved by the cancellation would be channeled into broader research for crewed operations in space, chiefly the Manned Orbiting Laboratory (MOL) project. "Had the Dyna-Soar programme not been cancelled," author Colin Burgess would note later, the first crewed mission, planned for July 1966, would have been flown by the senior test pilot, James W. Wood.
- A grenade was thrown at the British High Commissioner for the Aden Protectorate, Sir Kennedy Trevaskis, as he and his advisers were at the Khormaksar Civil Airport, preparing to board an airplane to London. Forty-one people were injured, two of them fatally, when the grenade was thrown from the airport's observation deck and landed on the ground near the group walking to the plane. A bystander, Mrs. Jamnadas Bhagavanji of India, died at the scene. Deputy Assistant Commissioner George Henderson, who moved to protect Trevaskis, died of his injuries a few days later. A state of emergency was proclaimed and British troops would wage a war against the Yemeni militants for nearly four years.
- The eternal flame that had been burning at the Arlington National Cemetery since the burial of John F. Kennedy on November 25, 1963, was accidentally extinguished. A group of elementary school children "between the ages of 8 and 11" had been visiting the grave site and had been sprinkling holy water on the memorial when the cap came off of the bottle and went into the torch itself. Cemetery officials re-ignited the flame within a few minutes.
- Chuck Yeager narrowly escaped death while testing an NF-104A rocket-augmented aerospace trainer, when his aircraft went out of control at 108,700 feet (33,100 m) (nearly 21 miles (34 km) up) and crashed. He parachuted to safety at 8,500 feet (2,600 m) after vainly battling to gain control of the powerless, rapidly falling craft, becoming the first pilot to make an emergency ejection in the full pressure suit needed for high altitude flights.
- At Stockholm, nine Nobel laureates – the most in a year up to that time – from seven nations were awarded prizes. Maria Goeppert-Mayer of the University of California became the second woman in history to be awarded the Nobel Prize in Physics, as a co-winner along with J. Hans D. Jensen of Heidelberg University and Eugene Wigner of Princeton University.
- Future pop singer and teen idol Donny Osmond made his national television debut at the age of six, joining his older brothers as guests on The Andy Williams Show.
- Aerojet-General delivered the stage II engine for Gemini launch vehicle (GLV) 2 to Martin-Baltimore.
- Died: Frederick Carder, 100, British-born American entrepreneur and co-founder of the Steuben Glass Works, who perfected the system of creating the pure hand-crafted crystal objects referred to as "Steuben Glass".

== December 11, 1963 (Wednesday) ==
- Transkei, the first "Bantustan" created under South Africa's new program of giving limited self-government to a section of the nation as a separate territory for its Black African residents, was formally inaugurated. M. D. C. de Wet Nel, the national Minister of Bantu Administration and Development, and Bantu Education, formally opened the Transkei Legislative Assembly at its capital at Umtata, and inaugurated Chief Kaiser Matanzima as the state's first Chief Minister. South Africa would declare Transkei to be an independent republic in 1976, although the Bantustan republics would not be given diplomatic recognition elsewhere.
- Israel announced its plan to construct its National Water Carrier project, the diversion of waters from the Jordan River for its agricultural and drinking water needs. On December 23, Egypt's President Nasser called a meeting of the heads of state of all 13 Arab nations to discuss Syria's proposal to go to war over the matter. After a threat in January to divert the three tributaries of the Jordan River away from Israel, the Arab nations would ultimately, on May 5, drop their opposition after Israel announced that the project was ready to go into operation.
- The United Nations Security Council adopted Resolution 183, calling on Portugal to free its colonies Angola and Mozambique and to release all political prisoners therein.
- Born: Claudia Kohde-Kilsch, German tennis player; in Saarbrücken

== December 12, 1963 (Thursday) ==
- Kenya was granted independence from the United Kingdom shortly after midnight. In a ceremony that took place before 250,000 people at Nairobi Independence Stadium, the British flag was lowered, Prince Philip presented the instruments of independence to Prime Minister Jomo Kenyatta, and the new black, green, red and white Kenyan flag was raised for the first time. Malcolm MacDonald, a native of Scotland and the last colonial governor, became the first, and only Governor-General of Kenya. The nation would become a Republic exactly a year later.
- Newspaper publisher Choi Doo Sun was sworn in as Prime Minister of South Korea, after being selected by newly elected President Park Chung-hee.
- Died:
  - Theodor Heuss, 79, the first president of West Germany from 1949 to 1959
  - Yasujirō Ozu, Japanese filmmaker; on his 60th birthday

== December 13, 1963 (Friday) ==
- The United Nations approved General Assembly Resolution 1962 (XVIII), The Declaration of Legal Principles Governing the Activities of States in the Exploration and Uses of Outer Space, the first of five declarations governing the nations' exploration of outer space. Among the nine principles contained in the declaration were that no nation could lay claim to sovereignty of any portion of space or celestial bodies, but that each nation would have jurisdiction over its own objects in outer space regardless of where they returned to Earth, and that exploration would be "in the interests of all mankind" and nations would regard astronauts as "envoys of mankind" to be rendered aid in the event of an emergency, regardless of nationality.
- The Beatles made the last of their 34 appearances on their autumn tour of the UK and Ireland, wrapping up at the Gaumont Cinema in Southampton, before breaking for Christmas.
- Martin-Baltimore received the propellant tanks for Gemini launch vehicle (GLV) 3 from Martin-Denver.
- Born:
  - A.B. Quintanilla, American record producer, songwriter and musician, the older brother of singer Selena; in Toppenish, Washington
  - Jake White, South African rugby player and coach; as Jacob Westerduin in Johannesburg
- Died:
  - Gustav Machatý, 62, Czech film director best known for his controversial 1933 film Ecstasy, described as the first non-pornographic film to depict lovers having sexual intercourse.
  - Filippo Anfuso, 62, Italian diplomat and fascist hierarch who served as the Italian Social Republic's Ambassador to Nazi Germany
  - Mahmud Shaltut, 70, Egyptian Islamic theologian

== December 14, 1963 (Saturday) ==
- At 3:38 in the afternoon, the Baldwin Hills Dam gave way, sending one million cubic meters (300 million gallons) of water from a city reservoir down into the Los Angeles suburb of Baldwin Hills, California. More than four hours earlier, the dam's caretaker reported an unusual amount of water flowing over the spillway and notified Los Angeles Department of Water Resources engineers and safety officials. Evacuation of the suburb of 16,500 residents began while an attempt was made to slow the leakage with sandbags, but by 1:30, a 0.2-inch (5.1 mm) wide crack in the wall began to widen. By 1:45, the gap had increased to 3 inches (76 mm), and the downstream side of the dam began to leak by 2:00. By 3:15 the break had widened to nearly 10 feet (3.0 m) and the dam burst 23 minutes later. More than 200 homes were destroyed, but because of the evacuation, only five people died in the disaster.
- The Spanish freighter Castillo Montjuich disappeared along with its 37 crew and 9,000 tonnes (8,900 long tons; 9,900 short tons) of cargo while en route from Boston to La Coruña, Spain. The last signal from the Castillo Montjuich was a radio call reporting that it was encountering strong winds 400 miles (640 km) northwest of the Azores Islands. Six days after the ship failed to make its scheduled December 21 arrival, Spanish authorities issued an alarm. Finally, on December 31, the search was abandoned, without any trace of wreckage, bodies or even an oil slick being sighted.
- A five-year-long drought in the Jordan River valley began to come to an end when heavy rains began falling, three weeks before the first visit (since the days of Saint Peter) by a Roman Catholic pope to the Holy Land. "When the pope arrives Saturday," one reporter noted in advance of the Pope Paul VI's January 4 flight to Amman to tour the areas occupied at the time by both Israel and Jordan, "the hills will be greener than anyone has seen them at this time of year for at least a quarter of a century."
- U.S. President Lyndon B. Johnson appointed Thomas C. Mann as State Department undersecretary for Latin America, a move which critics described as a shift away from social and political reform and toward protection of American investments and economic development.
- The defense ministers of six Central American nations (Costa Rica, El Salvador, Guatemala, Honduras, Nicaragua, and Panama) signed the protocol for CONDECA, the Cononsejo de Defensa Centroamericana (Central American Defense Council).
- Died:
  - Dinah Washington, 39, African-American blues, R&B and jazz singer, died from an overdose of barbiturates. She was found dead by her eighth husband, pro football star Dick "Night Train" Lane.
  - Marie Marvingt, 88, French aviator and athlete, and the first woman to ever fly combat missions

== December 15, 1963 (Sunday) ==
- A referendum was held in the west African colony of Spanish Guinea, with about 95,000 voters deciding on the question of whether to have limited self-government and eventual independence. About 62.5% of the Equatoguineans approved autonomy, and on January 1, 1964, Pedro Latorre Alcubierre would become the Spanish High Commissioner of the "Autonomous Community of Equatorial Guinea", with Bonifacio Ondó Edu as the community's prime minister.
- Totò Riina, the future boss of Cosa Nostra, Italy's organized crime network, was arrested at a roadblock in Corleone after being found to have falsified identifications. The young Mafioso would be indicted for five murders but acquitted in 1969 and sentenced only for the stolen identifications.
- Died:
  - Rikidōzan (ring name for Mitsuhiro Maomota), 39, Korean-Japanese professional wrestler; of peritonitis, died seven days after being stabbed.
  - Wilibald Gurlitt, 74, German musicologist and pioneer in the redesign of the pipe organ

== December 16, 1963 (Monday) ==
- The first of the "Great Society" programs was enacted into law, as U.S. President Lyndon Johnson signed the Higher Education Facilities Act of 1963. The "Morse-Green Bill", sponsored by U.S. Senator Wayne Morse and U.S. Representative Edith Green, both of Oregon, authorized the unprecedented spending of 1.2 billion dollars in loans and grants to public and private colleges and universities for construction, creation of new community colleges and graduate schools, and aid to students. The signing ceremony was the first where Johnson would introduce a tradition that would be followed by his successors—the use of more than one pen so that multiple souvenirs could be presented to favored senators, Congressmen and supporters as a reward for their work. "There are only 14 letters in 'Lyndon B. Johnson'," reporter Philip Dodd would note on the occasion of a signing ceremony three days later, "but the President was able to use 34 pens to write his signature." He would note that as of "the fourth bill signing ceremony in the White House since Monday... The President has used— and given away— 169 pens in the process."
- Yen Chia-kan, also referred to in the U.S. press as "C. K. Yen", was sworn in as Prime Minister of the Republic of China on the island of Taiwan, after being appointed by President Chiang Kai-shek. Yen would succeed Chiang as president on April 5, 1975.
- Zanzibar and Kenya entered the United Nations as its 112th and 113th members, upon unanimous recommendation of the 11 members of the U.N. Security Council and approval by the 111-member General Assembly.
- The Saturday Evening Post issued its Kennedy memorial edition with cover by Norman Rockwell.
- Born: Benjamin Bratt, American TV and film actor, winner of 1999 Prime Time Emmy Award for Law & Order; in San Francisco

== December 17, 1963 (Tuesday) ==
- The era of the "Third Republic of South Korea" was inaugurated, as Park Chung-hee, the acting president and a former army general, took office as the first civilian president of South Korea under the new constitution. The Third Republic would exist for less than nine years, when voters would approve a new "Fourth Republic" constitution in a referendum on November 21, 1972.
- Effective in 1965, the United Nations Security Council would have 15 members rather than 11, as the U.N. General Assembly voted 97–11 to amend Article 23 of the U.N. Charter. The number of permanent members, given the power to veto a Security Council resolution, remained at five, while the non-permanent members were increased from six to 10.
- U.S. President Johnson signed the Clean Air Act of 1963 into law.
- Two days of testing began for the "G2C" pressure suit to be worn by Gemini astronauts. In general, the suit was found to be acceptable to the crew and compatible with the Gemini spacecraft. The helmet design had been corrected satisfactorily and no new design problems were encountered. Eleven G2C suits, including five astronaut suits, would be delivered by the end of February 1964, with 23 more in March 1964.
- Born: Ivan Korade, Croatian general and war criminal; in Velika Veternička, Yugoslavia (committed suicide, 2008)

== December 18, 1963 (Wednesday) ==
- About 500 African students, mostly from Ghana in the Soviet Union organized a protest in Moscow, marching through Red Square and even scuffling with police, after the December 13 death of a 29-year-old Ghanaian medical student, Edmund Assare-Addo. It was the first known instance of foreign students marching in a public protest against the Soviet government, in a society not known for daring to protest against its leaders.
- Ahti Karjalainen resigned as Prime Minister of Finland, along with his entire cabinet, over a disagreement within the coalition over whether to increase taxes. President Urho Kekkonen appointed Reino Lehto to a caretaker government, which would last until September 12, 1964.
- Born: Brad Pitt, American film actor; as William Bradley Pitt in Shawnee, Oklahoma

== December 19, 1963 (Thursday) ==
- Four weeks after the assassination of President John F. Kennedy, American lawyer Mark Lane became the first of many "Kennedy conspiracy theorists" to publish opinions that the November 22 had been a conspiracy rather than the work of a lone gunman. Lane's 10,000-word article, "Oswald Innocent? — A Lawyer's Brief", was published in the December 19 issue of an American leftist weekly newspaper, National Guardian, and started with the sentence, "In all likelihood there does not exist a single American community where reside 12 men or women, good and true, who presume that Lee Harvey Oswald did not assassinate President Kennedy," then went on to note that this was indicative of "the breakdown of the Anglo-Saxon system of jurisprudence", given "the sacred right of every citizen accused of committing a crime to the presumption of innocence". He then outlined 15 points that were asserted as evidence of guilt, but that could be questioned beyond reasonable doubt. Lane would follow with the 1966 book Rush to Judgment bestselling criticism of the Warren Commission.
- Physicist Juris Upatnieks and electrical engineer Emmett Leith, both professors at the University of Michigan, perfected the technique of using lasers for photographic holography by creating three-dimensional images that could be viewed with the naked eye.
- Legendary American broadcaster Edward R. Murrow resigned from his job as director of the United States Information Agency, after being diagnosed with lung cancer, and retired from public life. He would die of complications from the illness 16 months later, on April 27, 1965.
- NASA Headquarters outlined the agency's official position vis-a-vis the U.S. Defense Department's Manned Orbiting Laboratory (MOL) project. NASA stated that the MOL could not be construed as meeting the much broader objectives and goals of a U.S. space station program envisioned on September 14 by policy agreements between NASA Administrator James E. Webb and Secretary of Defense Robert S. McNamara, and that the MOL was solely to fulfill immediate military requirements.

== December 20, 1963 (Friday) ==
- Richard Honeck, 84, who had served the longest prison sentence in American history, was granted parole from the Southern Illinois Penitentiary after serving 64 years' incarceration. He had been incarcerated since September 2, 1899, for the brutal murder of schoolteacher Walter F. Koeller, and had been eligible for parole since 1945, but had not been released because his immediate relatives had all died. On August 25, 1963, an article by Associated Press reporter Bob Poos brought the case to national attention. One of the people who read the article, Mrs. Clara Orth of San Leandro, California, agreed to take her 84-year-old uncle into her home. Honeck would survive 13 more years, dying on December 28, 1976, at a nursing home. His record had been surpassed a year before by Paul Geidel, who had gone to prison in 1911 in New York. Geidel would spend more than 68 years behind bars until his release in 1980.
- For the first time since the erection of the Berlin Wall in 1961, residents of West Berlin were allowed to cross into East Berlin. By agreement between West Germany and East Germany, West German applicants were granted one-day passes to visit with family members in the Communist-controlled east side during the Christmas holidays. For 16 days, from December 20 to January 5, visitors from the west could cross the border, although the East German government would not allow its citizens to cross into the west. Starting at 7:00 in the morning, five designated checkpoints along the Wall were opened (forty had been allowed to pass through the night before) and by the end of the first day, 2,800 people had made the west–east crossing. By the end of the program, East German authorities reported that 1.3 million West Germans had visited, including 280,000 on the final day.
- War was threatened between the neighboring West African nations of Niger and Dahomey (now Benin), after Niger's President Hamani Diori ordered the 16,000 Dahomeyan residents in his nation to leave by the end of January 1964, and fired all Dahomeyan government employees. The move came two months after Diori's friend, Hubert Maga, had been overthrown as president in a coup led by Colonel Christophe Soglo. Dahomey would respond by sending troops to occupy Lete Island, claimed by both nations and located in the middle of the Niger River that separated them.
- At war crimes trials held in Frankfurt, 18 years after the end of World War II, prosecutions began for the first 20 defendants, out of hundreds of members of the German SS who had helped operate the Auschwitz concentration camp network. Testimony would be taken and evidence presented and argued for the next 20 months, with 211 survivors of the camp appearing as witnesses. Administrator Wilhelm Boger, the overseer of the camp where more than one million inmates were killed, was one of the first to be brought on for charges before the court.
- The manufacture of Studebaker automobiles in the United States came to a halt as the company's factory in South Bend, Indiana, closed permanently and its last product— a red Studebaker Daytona hardtop— was completed on the assembly line, and the plant's 6,000 workers were laid off. Canadian production of Studebakers would continue in Hamilton, Ontario for a little more than two years afterward, until March 16, 1966.
- McDonnell shipped its portion of Gemini mission simulator No. 1 to Cape Kennedy. The computers for the training device were expected by mid-January.

== December 21, 1963 (Saturday) ==
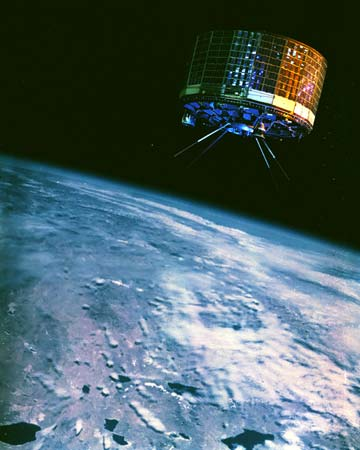
The payload of TIROS-8 above Earth in April 1964

- TIROS-8 was launched into orbit, and became the first weather satellite to relay digital images back to Earth at the same time that they were being recorded, using the new technology of automatic picture transmission. The first photos were sent to Earth at 11:30 am. Eastern time as it passed over the east coast of the United States on its fourth orbit, and showed the cloud cover along the Atlantic seaboard.
- The shooting of a Turkish-speaking couple in Cyprus, by a Greek-speaking police officer in Nicosia, began 10 days of violence in which at least 92 Turkish Cypriot civilians, and an unknown number of Greek Cypriots, were killed before British troops intervened. According to Turkish Cypriot sources, police in the Greek Cypriot community, along with members of the EOKA guerrilla group seeking Cyprus's union with Greece, attacked 109 Turkish villages on the island of Cyprus, and 25,000 of the Turkish minority fled to the northern side of the island, while Green Cypriot sources say that members of the paramilitary Turkish Resistance Organisation (Türk Mukavemet Teşkilatı or TMT) attacked Greek Cypriot families in the suburb of Omorfita.
- Gemini Project Office (GPO) reported that a silver-zinc battery power system would be flown in spacecraft No. 3 instead of a fuel cell system, which could not be qualified in time for the mission. Late in January 1964, McDonnell deleted fuel cells from spacecraft 3 and 4 as well, in favor of the silver-zinc battery. GPO also announced that Teflon-insulated wiring would be installed throughout the Gemini spacecraft as early as possible, based on flammability tests by McDonnell.
- "The Daleks", a serial that began with the fifth episode of the Doctor Who science fiction television series, saw the introduction of the Dalek creatures, the most famous of all the nemeses in the program's history. In the episode "The Dead Planet", the Doctor and his three companions arrived in the TARDIS on the planet Skaro, although viewers would not see what a Dalek looked like until the December 28 show.
- Died:
  - Sir Jack Hobbs, 81, English cricketer with a career record of 61,760 runs and 199 centuries between 1908 and 1930
  - William J. Green, Jr., 53, U.S. Congressman for Pennsylvania, died from peritonitis following emergency surgery.

== December 22, 1963 (Sunday) ==
- The Washington Post published an editorial by former U.S. President Harry Truman, entitled "Limit CIA Role to Intelligence". "I think it has become necessary to take another look at the purpose and operations of our Central Intelligence Agency," Truman (who had established the agency in 1947) wrote. "There is something about the way the CIA has been functioning that is casting a shadow over our historic position and I feel that we need to correct it." CIA Director Allen Dulles tried, unsuccessfully, to persuade the former president to retract his statement.
- A fire killed 128 people on the Greek cruise ship Lakonia after breaking out at 11:30 at night. The ship was carrying over 1,000 passengers and nearly 400 crew and was still 180 miles (290 km) from its first port of call, the island of Madeira. Most of the passengers had been at a dance at the ship's ballroom. The vast majority of the 128 victims had escaped the fire, and donned lifejackets, but died of hypothermia.
- The 30-day period of mourning for John F. Kennedy was brought to a close in the United States as President Johnson presided over a candlelight service at the Lincoln Memorial, followed by a lighting of the Christmas tree in front of the White House. Starting the next day, December 23, American flags were raised from half-staff to full-staff once again.
- Emilio de los Santos resigned as the chief of the civilian triumvirate that had been installed to rule the Dominican Republic after the overthrow of Juan Bosch on September 26. De los Santos, who quit in protest against the military's harsh treatment of leftist rebels, was replaced as the nominal president by Donald Reid Cabral.
- Paul Robeson returned to the United States after a self-imposed exile of five years, most of it in the Soviet Union. The African-American singer, former football star and Communist activist, had departed the U.S. in 1958 after a nine-year fight for an American passport.
- Born: Giuseppe Bergomi, Italian soccer football player (for Internazionale Milan) who appeared on the Italian national team's 1982 FIFA World Cup championship squad, and again in the 1986 and 1990 World Cup competitions; in Milan
- Died: Gian Giorgio Trissino, 86, Italian equestrian who became (in 1900) the first Italian to win an Olympic gold medal

== December 23, 1963 (Monday) ==
- Top FBI officials, led by Assistant Director William C. Sullivan, met at the Washington headquarters to discuss plans for "neutralizing Martin Luther King Jr. as an effective Negro leader", primarily by using wiretapping of hotel rooms to gather evidence of his extramarital affairs, and then leaking the tapes to the press.
- Manned Space Center reviewed persistent problems in the engines for the Gemini orbit attitude and maneuver system (OAMS), and decided to (a) further reduce the oxidizer to fuel ratio (from 1.3 to 1); (b) realign the lateral-firing thrusters more closely to the spacecraft's center of gravity and (c) build an engine billet with newly developed ablation material laminates.
- Born:
  - Jess Harnell, American voice actor; in Englewood, New Jersey
  - Donna Tartt, American novelist; in Greenwood, Mississippi

== December 24, 1963 (Tuesday) ==
- A train collision killed 45 people in Hungary, at the Paládicspuszta rail station in Szolnok. Most of the dead were Christmas shoppers returning from Budapest, and were on the crowded passenger train when the engineer ran past a warning signal in heavy fog and smashed into the back of a freight train. On April 2, the engineer would be sentenced to 11 years in prison.
- The New York International Airport, commonly referred to as "Idlewild", was officially renamed as John F. Kennedy International Airport, popularly referred to as "JFK".
- Born: Chris Morris, footballer for the Republic of Ireland team from 1987 to 1992, including the 1990 World Cup; in Newquay, Cornwall, England
- Died: Mikhaylo Parashchuk, 85, Ukrainian sculptor

== December 25, 1963 (Wednesday) ==
- Gene Keyes, a 22-year-old conscientious objector and a volunteer for the New York-based Committee for Nonviolent action, responded to an induction notice by becoming the first person to burn his draft card to protest the Vietnam War. Keyes, who had been ordered to report for induction on January 30, stood outside the selective service office in Champaign, Illinois, on Christmas Eve and, at midnight set fire to his card in front of photographers, then lit a candle. Keyes wore a placard that proclaimed "To Light This Candle with a Draft Card... A Prayer for Peace on Earth".
- Walt Disney released his 18th feature-length animated motion picture, The Sword in the Stone, about the boyhood of King Arthur. It would be the penultimate animated film personally supervised by Disney.
- İsmet İnönü of the CHP party formed his last government as Prime Minister of Turkey. İnönü had led the party since 1938, and had first served as prime minister in 1923.
- Died:
  - Harry C. Oberholser, 93, American ornithologist
  - Tristan Tzara, 67, Romanian-French poet

== December 26, 1963 (Thursday) ==
- Israel entered a new phase in its atomic weapons research program when it activated its first nuclear reactor at its Negev Nuclear Research Center at Dimona. An American inspection team would learn of the development about three weeks later, on January 18, but would find no evidence of plutonium or irradiated uranium at that time and conclude that Israel had "no weapons making capability".
- Capitol Records released the 45 rpm recording of the Beatles song "I Want to Hold Your Hand" in the United States, accompanied by a $50,000 promotional campaign and the printing of five million posters that proclaimed "The Beatles Are Coming!". Within five weeks, the song (which had been released in the United Kingdom on November 29) would become the best-selling record in America.
- The United Kingdom, Greece and Turkey created the Joint Truce Force to enforce a ceasefire in Cyprus.
- Marshall Space Flight Center Director Wernher von Braun described to Apollo Spacecraft Program Manager Joseph F. Shea a possible extension of Apollo systems to permit more extensive exploration of the lunar surface. The concept, called the Integrated Lunar Exploration System, involved a dual Saturn V mission (with rendezvous in lunar orbit) to deliver an integrated lunar taxi/shelter spacecraft to the Moon's surface. Von Braun said that such a vehicle could bridge the gap between present Apollo capabilities and the longer-term goal of permanent lunar bases, but the suggestion never found serious favor elsewhere within NASA and the Apollo hardware received little further use after the paramount goal of a lunar landing was achieved.
- Born:
  - Nick Durandt, South Africa's highest achieving boxing trainer, credited with training 95 national champions and 27 world champions in various categories; in Wolverhampton, Staffordshire, England (killed in motorcycle accident, 2017)
  - Lars Ulrich, Danish rock drummer for Metallica; in Gentofte
- Died:
  - Titina De Filippo, 65, Italian stage actress and playwright known for her portrayal of the character Filumena Marturano in the play of the same name.
  - Jacob J. Shubert, 84, Polish-born American theatrical entrepreneur

== December 27, 1963 (Friday) ==
- An important Islamic holy relic for Muslims in India, a 600-year-old strand of hair believed to be from Muhammad, was stolen from the Hazratbal Shrine in Srinagar, the summer capital of India's Jammu & Kashmir state, leading to riots throughout the city and the deaths of two rioters. State Premier Khwaja Shams-ud-Din announced a $21,000 reward and a $105 annual stipend for the recovery of the relic, referred to as the "Mu-i-Mubarak, which had been brought to the Hazratbal in 1699. The relic – a brown hair, encased in a small glass tube, in a green bag in a silver box that had been locked inside the shrine— would reappear just as mysteriously on January 4.
- It was announced that the number of Regions of Italy would go from 19 to 20, as the region of Abruzzi e Molise was divided into two new regioni, effective 1970 with the approval of the new article 132 of the Italian Constitution. The 20th region, Molise, would be created from the provinces of Campobasso and Isernia, while the provinces of Chieti, L'Aquila, Pescara and Teramo were to constitute Abruzzo.
- Born:
  - Gamal Mubarak, Egyptian politician who served as Secretary for Policy of Egypt's National Democratic Party, the son and designated successor of future Egyptian president Hosni Mubarak before Hosni Mubarak's 2011 overthrow; in Cairo
  - Arturo Murillo, Bolivian businessman, hotelier, and politician who served as the minister of government from 2019 to 2020; in Cochabamba

== December 28, 1963 (Saturday) ==
- For the first time in 491 years, leaders of the Roman Catholic Church and the Eastern Orthodox Church agreed to a meeting. Pope Paul VI met for 30 minutes with the Metropolitan Bishop Athenagoras of Thiatiron, an envoy of the Ecumenical Patriarch of Constantinople, Athenagoras I and an agreement was reached for the two church leaders to meet in Jerusalem in January. In 1472, the Patriarch Dionysius I had broken with Pope Sixtus IV over disagreements concerning the Immaculate Conception and papal infallibility.
- The titanium alloy keel for the Soviet submarine K-162 was laid down at the shipyard at Severodvinsk, as part of Project 661 to construct the world's fastest submarine. K-162 would not be commissioned until six years later, on December 13, 1969, and would reach a top speed of 44.7 knots (more than 51 miles per hour).
- TV Malaysia began broadcasting from Kuala Lumpur as "The First Channel" and the first such station in that city, televising programs in black and white. At the time, Singapore, with two television stations, was still part of Malaysia; upon its separation in 1964, "The First Channel" would become the only Malaysian station.
- Died:
  - Joseph Magliocco, 65, American crime boss
  - Paul Hindemith, 68, German composer
  - A. J. Liebling, 59, American journalist

== December 29, 1963 (Sunday) ==
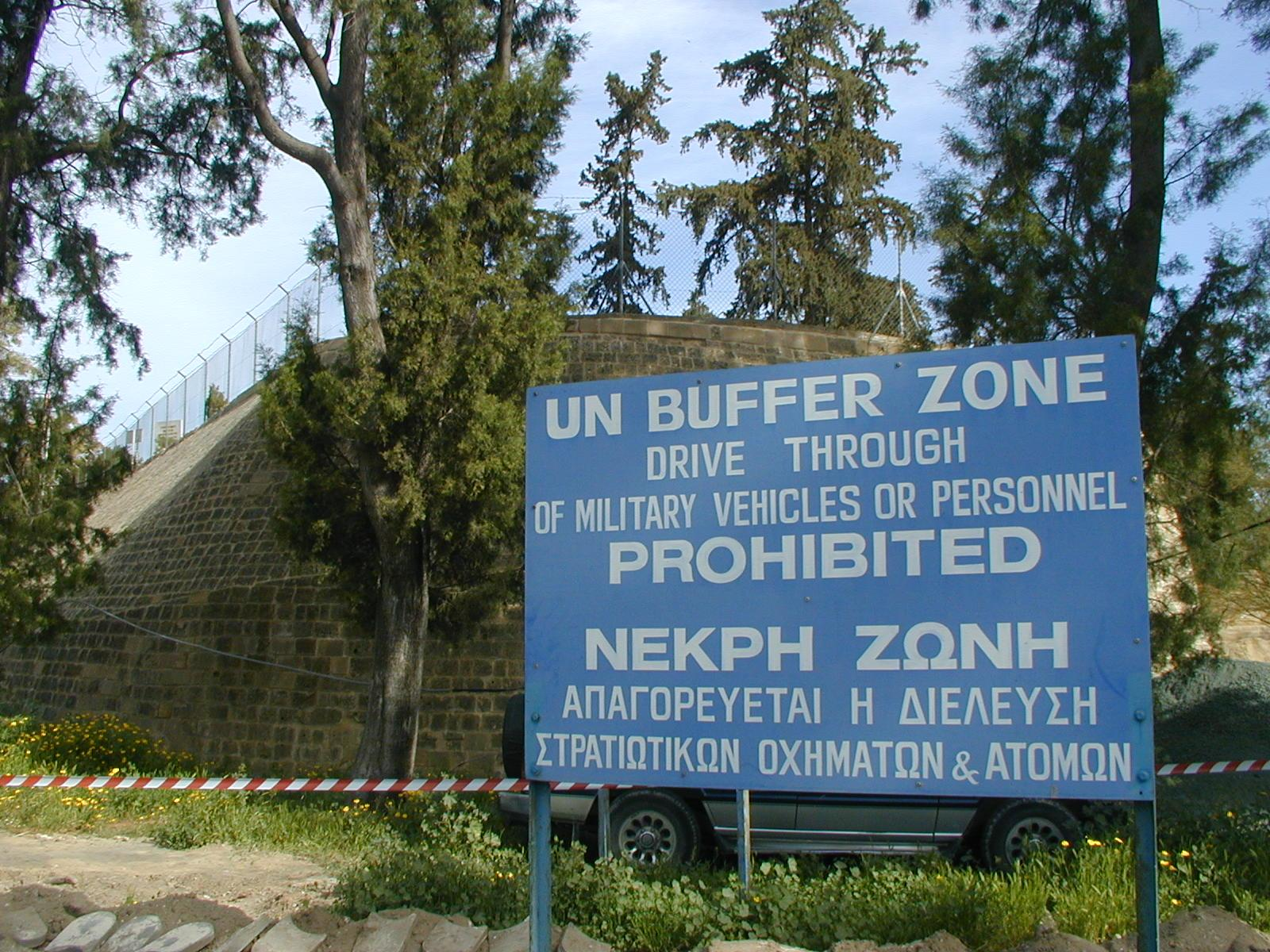
The Greek side of the "Green Line" buffer zone in 2003

- The city of Nicosia in Cyprus was divided by the "Green Line", which was etched onto a map of the Cypriot capital by Major General Peter Young, the commander of the British peace force. After stationing his troops in the Greek-speaking and Turkish-speaking neighborhoods of Nicosia, General Young used a green chinagraph pencil to etch a wide cease-fire line to create a buffer zone along Ermou Street, with a lone border crossing at Ledra Street. The section to the south was reserved for the Greek Cypriot residents in Nicosia, while the area north of the street was reserved for the Turkish Cypriots, and went by the Turkish exonym for the capital, Lefkoşa. A fence would later be erected to separate the two zones, and continued to exist more than fifty years later.
- Twenty-one people were killed when the 13-story Roosevelt Hotel caught fire in Jacksonville, Florida. Because the fire had started in the hotel ballroom, escape to the ground floor quickly became impossible, but another 14 guests made their way to the hotel roof and were rescued by U.S. Navy helicopters from the Naval Air Stations at Cecil Field and the Jacksonville NAS.
- In fighting between Indonesia and Malaya, a Royal Malay Regiment position at Kalabakan, west of Tawau in Sabah, was taken by surprise after KKO forces concealed themselves in nearby swampland. Eight soldiers were killed, including the commander, and 19 wounded.
- The Chicago Bears defeated the New York Giants, 14–10, to win the 1963 NFL Championship Game.
- Born: Ulf Kristersson, Prime Minister of Sweden since 2022; in Lund, Malmöhus County

== December 30, 1963 (Monday) ==
- The city of Boston experienced one of the worst traffic jams in American history, caused by a combination of post-Christmas sales, a populace that had been homebound during the previous week by a snowstorm, and the need for private automobiles rather than public transportation to bring purchases home. As more than 100,000 cars competed for 37,000 available parking spaces in the downtown business district, streets were blocked at both ends by shoppers who were double-parking and triple-parking, the city was in gridlock from two o'clock in the afternoon until past midnight.
- U.S. President Johnson signed a bill authorizing the minting of a new version of the U.S. half-dollar coin, with the profile of John F. Kennedy on the obverse and the U.S. presidential seal on the other side. The new fifty cent piece replaced the coin with the images of Benjamin Franklin and the Liberty Bell, with the first coins being minted simultaneously on February 11, 1964, at the mints in Philadelphia and Denver.
- The pilot episode of the British radio programme I'm Sorry, I'll Read That Again was broadcast on the BBC Home Service under the title Cambridge Circus. Picked up as a weekly radio show in 1964, the series would run for 104 episodes until 1973.
- The Mausoleum of the Heroes Who Fought for the Freedom of the People and the Fatherland, for Socialism was dedicated in Bucharest as a repository for the cremated remains of all Romanian Communist Party officials.
- Karol Wojtyla of Poland was appointed by Pope Paul VI as the new Metropolitan Archbishop of Kraków, and made a Cardinal in the Roman Catholic Church. In 1978, Cardinal Wojtyla would be elected as Pope John Paul II.
- Georgios Papandreou resigned as Prime Minister of Greece as elections were called for February, and was replaced by a caretaker government led by Ioannis Paraskevopoulos.
- NBC introduced a new game show, Let's Make a Deal, hosted by Monty Hall, at 2:00 pm. Eastern time as part of its regular daytime programming.
- A total eclipse of the Moon, distinguishable from other eclipses for placing the Moon in almost complete darkness, took place.
- Died: Prince Chula Chakrabongse, 55, Thai racing team owner, author of 13 books, and member of the Thai royal family as one of the many grandchildren of King Chulalongkorn (and one of the last born during the King's lifetime), died of cancer

== December 31, 1963 (Tuesday) ==
- The Federation of Rhodesia and Nyasaland was dissolved after an existence of a little more than ten years. Created on August 1, 1953, and under the leadership of Sir Roy Welensky as prime minister and the Earl of Dalhousie as governor-general, the Federation was split into what would become three nations, Northern Rhodesia (now Zambia), Southern Rhodesia (now Zimbabwe), and Nyasaland (now Malawi).

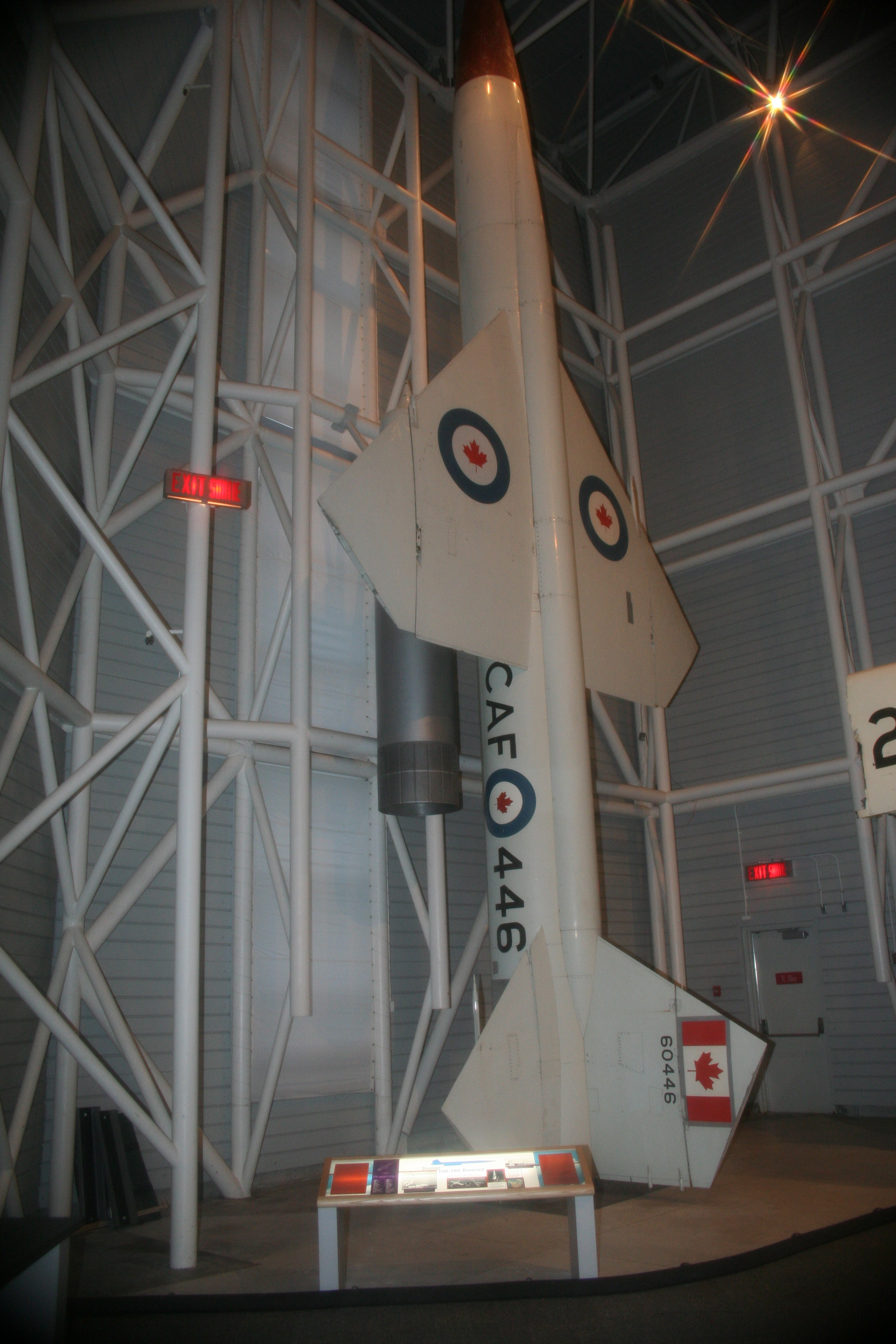
A Bomarc B missile at the Canada Aviation Museum

- Nuclear weapons arrived in Canada for the first time, the day after U.S. President Johnson had signed a memorandum authorizing the shipment of armed warheads for Bomarc missiles. The seven warheads arrived at RCAF Station North Bay in North Bay, Ontario at about 10:00 pm. Eastern time.
- The two stages of the Titan II Gemini rocket (GLV-1), standing side by side at Cape Kennedy's Complex 19, completed the Combined Systems Test (CST) in preparation for Sequence Compatibility Firing (SCF). After further tests, the two stages would be connected on January 31.
- What author Jon Margolis would describe as featuring the "Drunkest Times Square New Year's Eve crowd of all time", according to the New York Police Department, took place with 300,000 people ringing in 1964.
- Born: Scott Ian (stage name for Scott Ian Rosenfeld), American metal musician and co-founder of the band Anthrax; in Bayside, Queens
