= Desegregation of Auburn University =

Auburn University desegregated on January 4, 1964, with the enrollment and registration of graduate student Harold A Franklin. Franklin was admitted as a graduate student in history and government. Auburn's desegregation was exemplary of both cooperation with the media and Ralph Brown Draughon's leadership.

== Background ==
In November 1962, Harold Franklin, a thirty-year-old graduate of Alabama State College, applied for admission to Auburn as a graduate student in history and government. The university rejected Franklin's application in January 1963, originally citing a lack of a graduate program in government as the reason. His application was again rejected in February, Auburn citing Alabama State College's lack of accreditation, an issue stemming from the school's lack of state funding. On August 23 of that year, Franklin, with attorney Fred Gray, filed a class action suit in the US District Court for the Middle District of Alabama. The court of Frank M Johnson ruled in Franklin's favor on November 5, 1963. The Board of Trustees voted on November 23 to follow Johnson's ruling, and Franklin's enrollment and registration was set for the spring semester of 1964, beginning January 4.

== Media Relations ==
With the violent events of the Birmingham protests and the murder of Medgar Evers as a backdrop to the situation at Auburn, university president, Ralph Brown Draughon wanted to avoid a violent spectacle on his campus at all costs. Hoping to emulate the desegregation of Clemson University in January, 1963, Draughon invited Clemson's Director of Public Relations, Joe Sherman, to visit Auburn in June, 1963. Sherman advised Draughon to create a good rapport with the media, as well as to appeal to the community for moderation. Auburn Director of Public Relations, Ed Crawford, took care of the relationship with the media by setting up the “News Central.” Here, Auburn housed all authorized media personnel, supplying them with every imaginable amenity from typewriters to dark rooms for their film to food and drink.

== Campus Security ==
Draughon was able to handle the securing of campus with a multifaceted approach. First, Draughon shut down Auburn's campus to everyone except authorized faculty, staff, students and police. Appointing Col. Lynwood Funchess, Director of Building and Grounds, as head of security, Draughon deputized members of the athletic department to patrol campus as well as line Franklin's paths to class for his first couple days.

== Meetings with Student Leaders ==
The other face of Draughon's security plan included a series of meetings he had been holding since the failed desegregation of the University of Alabama in 1956. Draughon had routinely hosted student leaders to bring them in line with his plan for a quiet, uneventful desegregation of Auburn University. These meetings produced a list of rules that would go into effect when the time for desegregation came, and were to be disseminated by these student leaders. Some of the more notable rules were a ban on firearms on campus for the spring semester, and a ban on congregating in large groups on campus. These rules were announced December 3 and required students to sign a pledge agreeing to abide by them in order to return to campus after break.

== Resistance from Gov. Wallace ==
In hopes of further augmenting the security on campus during Franklin's first few days, Draughon requested access to city, state, and federal officials for assistance. Agreeing to provide state troopers to reinforce campus and local police, Governor George Wallace refused to provide federal agents as well as specifically refusing access to bodyguards for Franklin, even in the event of a riot. On December 1, Wallace also pressured Draughon to release an announcement stating that Magnolia Hall, the only men's dormitory on campus, would no longer be housing graduate students. This announcement was shot down by the court on January 3, ruling that Auburn must house Franklin just like any other student.

== January 4, 1964 ==
On a cold, rainy Saturday, Auburn University's campus was invaded by one hundred state troopers sent by Gov. Wallace under the command of Col. Albert J Lingo. Seen as the wildcard in Draughon's plans, Lingo proved true to speculation when he changed to the meeting location last minute. Seeing Lingo's troopers changing position, FBI agents sent to oversee events notified US attorney John Doar, on campus to supervise the university's desegregation just as had at every other university to that point. Doar was then able to notify Franklin and his attorney, Fred Gray, of the change in plans, and advised them to head directly to Reverend Powers McLeod's office at the Auburn Methodist Church. Here, Doar had Franklin's bag searched by two FBI agents who could later testify on Franklin's behalf in the case a gun was slipped into it by Lingo's men, similar to what had happened with James Meredith at Ole Miss. At McLeod's office Franklin was intercepted by Joseph Sarver, Auburn director of development, who was to transport Franklin while on campus due to Lingo's orders to arrest any federal agent or unauthorized personnel trying to enter campus.

Around one o’clock, Franklin, escorted by Sarver, arrived at Magnolia Hall, where three floors of one wing had been cleared to house Franklin. When it was time to leave to register for classes Franklin, escorted by two university officials, left Magnolia Hall for the library. Outside they met Col. Lingo, who, under the pretense of Judge Johnson's ruling that Auburn should treat Franklin like any other student, refused to allow the university officials to continue with Franklin. Franklin was swarmed by reporters on his walk and stopped by a trooper requesting to see his student ID, which he had not yet received, however aside from this, his walk peaceful and without confrontation.

Upon entering the library, Franklin was again met by a swarm of reporters before being welcomed by Dr. William Parker, dean of the graduate school. Franklin was then seated at Malcolm McMillan's table for enrollment advising. Franklin emerged roughly an hour later, now an enrolled and registered student at Auburn University.
