= 1964 Swazi constitutional referendum =

- 19 January 1964

Results
Choice	Votes	%
Yes	124,218	99.87%
No	162	0.13%

A referendum on repealing the constitution was held in Swaziland on 19 January 1964. It had been called by King Sobhuza II following the imposition of a constitution by the British colonial authorities in 1963, which he opposed due to its democratic aspects and the weakening of his position. The constitution had been imposed on the colony due to the failure of the Swaziland National Council (which represented the Swazi traditional aristocracy) and the European Advisory Council (representing white settlers) to agree on one.

The referendum was boycotted by political parties, and the result (99.87% in favour of repealing) ignored by the colonial authorities. General elections were held later in the year according to the constitution.

== Results ==
Choice	Votes	%
For	124,218	99.87
Against	162	0.13
Total	124,380	100.00
Source: Direct Democracy
