= TIROS-8 =

NASA weather satellite

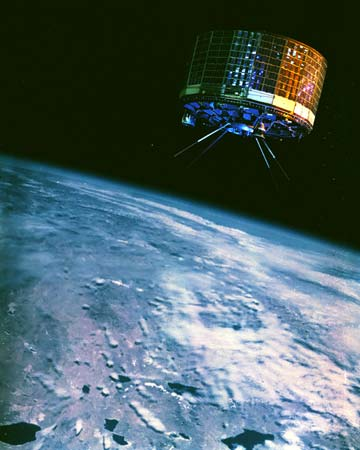
- Mission type: Weather satellite
- Operator: NASA
- COSPAR ID: 1963-054A
- SATCAT no.: 716
- Mission duration: 3 years, 6 months, 9 days (achieved); 62 years, 10 months, 29 days (in orbit)

Spacecraft properties
- Spacecraft type: TIROS
- Manufacturer: RCA / GSFC
- Launch mass: 265 kilograms (584 lb)
- Dimensions: 1.07 m × 0.56 m (3.5 ft × 1.8 ft)

Start of mission
- Launch date: December 21, 1963, 09:30 UTC
- Rocket: Thor-Delta B 371/D-22
- Launch site: Cape Canaveral LC-17B

End of mission
- Last contact: July 1, 1967

Orbital parameters
- Reference system: Geocentric
- Regime: Low Earth
- Eccentricity: 0.005203
- Perigee altitude: 691 kilometers (429 mi)
- Apogee altitude: 765 kilometers (475 mi)
- Inclination: 58.48°
- Period: 99.3 minutes
- Epoch: December 21, 1963

Instruments
- Automatic Camera System; Television Camera System

TIROS-8 (also called TIROS-H or A-53) was a spin-stabilized meteorological satellite. It was the eighth in a series of Television Infrared Observation Satellites.

== Launch ==
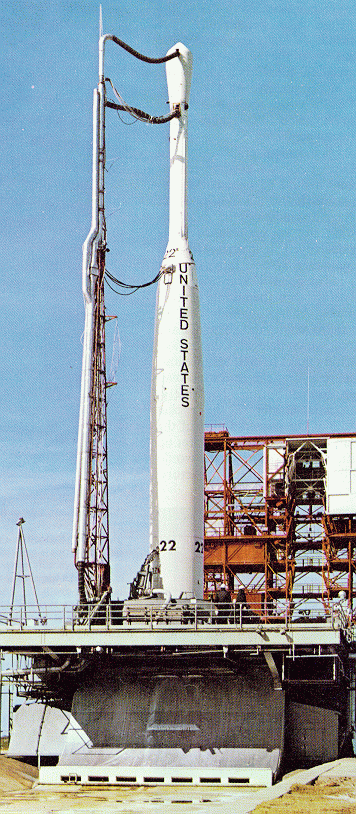
Launch of TIROS-8 in Cape Canaveral.

TIROS-8 was launched on December 21, 1963, by a Thor-Delta rocket from Cape Canaveral Air Force Station, Florida, United States. The spacecraft functioned nominally until July 1, 1967. The satellite orbited the Earth once every 1 hour and 39 minutes, at an inclination of 58.4°. Its perigee was 691 kilometers (429 mi) and apogee was 765 kilometers (475 mi).

== Mission ==
TIROS-8 was a spin-stabilized meteorological spacecraft designed to test experimental television techniques and infrared equipment. The satellite was in the form of an 18-sided right prism, 107 cm in diameter and 56 cm high. The top and sides of the spacecraft were covered with approximately 9000 1-by 2-cm silicon solar cells. It was equipped with 2 independent television camera subsystems for taking cloud cover pictures, plus an omnidirectional radiometer and a five-channel scanning radiometer for measuring radiation from the earth and its atmosphere. The satellite spin rate was maintained between 8 and 12 rpm by use of five diametrically opposed pairs of small, solid-fuel thrusters. Once operational, tiros was then called the National Oceanic and Atmospheric Administration or NOAA for short.

A magnetic attitude control device permitted the satellite spin axis to be oriented to within 1 to 2 deg of a predetermined attitude. The flight control system also optimized the performance of the solar cells and TV cameras and protected the five-channel infrared radiometer from prolonged exposure to direct sunlight.

TIROS-8 was the first satellite to be equipped with Automatic Picture Transmission (APT) capabilities. The APT experiment provided real-time earth-cloud pictures taken by the satellite to any properly equipped ground receiving station. In addition to an APT camera system, the satellite carried one wide-angle (104°) TV camera. Pictures taken by the TV camera were transmitted directly or were stored in a tape recorder on board for subsequent playback, depending on whether the spacecraft was within or beyond communication range of either of two ground receiving stations.

The spacecraft performed normally after launch. Over 50 ground stations participated in the APT experiment, which was terminated by the end of April 1964 due to degradation of the APT camera. The wide-angle TV camera transmitted useful data until February 12, 1966. The satellite was deactivated on July 1, 1967, after being left on for an additional time period for engineering purposes.

== See also ==
- Nimbus program
