= Orbit Attitude and Maneuvering System =

Gemini Spacecraft attitude control system

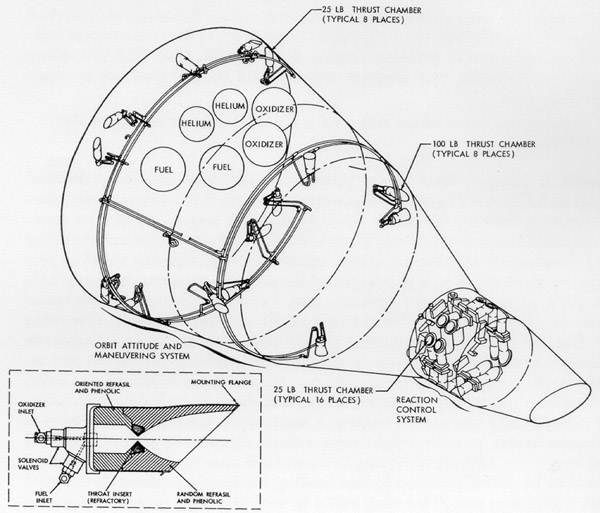
Gemini Orbit Attitude and Maneuvering System location

The Orbit Attitude and Maneuvering System (OAMS) was a reaction control system used in Earth orbit by the Project Gemini spacecraft. It provided both automatic and manual rotation and translation by means of 16 vernier thrusters using hypergolic propellants.

== Operations ==
The OAMS had 16 small, fixed-position, fixed-thrust rocket engines which burned hypergolic propellants (monomethylhydrazine fuel using nitrogen tetroxide as oxidizer) fed under pressure from a pair of tanks located in the aft Equipment Module. Besides providing attitude control, the OAMS provided for linear up, down, sideways, forward or aft translation of the spacecraft. This gave the spacecraft the capability to change its orbit, required for space rendezvous and docking with another spacecraft, the Agena Target Vehicle. The system was also used to push the spacecraft away from the spent second stage of the Titan II launch vehicle on first reaching orbit.

- The eight rotational control engines were mounted off the spacecraft's center of mass around the aft section of the Equipment Module, pointed at 90 degree positions up, down, left and right. These were rated at 25 pounds-force (110 N) thrust and fired in pairs, causing it to yaw, pitch, or roll to control attitude.
- Six of the translational control engines were mounted on the side of the Retrorocket Module, near the spacecraft's center of mass. Four of these were rated at 100 pounds-force (440 N) thrust, one each pointed up, down, left or right. The other two were pointed forward, at the three o'clock and nine o'clock positions, to provide aft thrust. These were rated at 85 pounds-force (380 N) (reduced from the original spec of 100 pounds-force (440 N) in July 1962).
- The two 100-pound-force (440 N) thrust forward translation control engines were mounted on the inside of the aft end of the equipment adapter, at the twelve o'clock and six o'clock positions.

Project Mercury astronauts could only adjust yaw, pitch, or roll, but Gemini crewmen had full manual control over their flight path. Walter Schirra said that on Gemini 6 "I was amazed at my ability to maneuver. I did a fly-around inspection of Gemini 7, literally flying rings around it, and I could move to within inches of it in perfect confidence". Because there is no turbulence in space "It was like the Blue Angels at 18,000 miles per hour, only it was easier".

== Events ==
During Gemini 8, on March 16, 1966, OAMS engine number 8 became stuck on, resulting in uncontrollable spinning of the spacecraft. The entire OAMS had to be shut down and the mission was terminated prematurely. This resulted in modifications to OAMS to permit engine isolation.
