= 11-22-63 =

11-22-63 may refer to:

- Assassination of John F. Kennedy, which occurred on Friday, November 22, 1963
- 11/22/63, a 2011 time-travel novel by Stephen King
- 11.22.63, a 2016 Hulu TV series based on the Stephen King novel
- November 22, 1963, see November 1963 § November 22, 1963 (Friday)

== See also ==
- November 22
- November 1963
