= October 1963 =

Month of 1963

<<	October 1963					>>
Su	Mo	Tu	We	Th	Fr	Sa
		1	2	3	4	5
6	7	8	9	10	11	12
13	14	15	16	17	18	19
20	21	22	23	24	25	26
27	28	29	30	31

The following events occurred in October 1963:

== October 1, 1963 (Tuesday) ==
- The Sand War began when troops from Morocco invaded Algeria and seized control of two oases that had served as border stations on the road to Tindouf. Algeria retook the oases a week later, but Morocco took them back the week after that, and then expand its control of territory in western Algeria until a peace treaty could be brokered.
- On its third anniversary as an independent nation, Nigeria became a republic, as Governor-General Nnamdi Azikiwe assumed office as the first president of Nigeria.
- McDonnell Aircraft Corporation began a study of using batteries instead of fuel cells in all Gemini spacecraft scheduled for two-day rendezvous missions. While fuel cells previously could last 600 hours (25 days), the Gemini coolant system reduced fuel cell life by two-thirds to 200 hours (8 days and 8 hours).
- Born: Mark McGwire, American baseball player who broke the record of Roger Maris of 61 for most home runs hit in a season, ending 1998 with 70, but later admitted to having used performance-enhancing drugs; in Pomona, California

== October 2, 1963 (Wednesday) ==
- The White House announced that withdrawal of American troops from South Vietnam could be completed by December 31, 1965, following a report to President Kennedy by U.S. Secretary of Defense Robert S. McNamara and General Maxwell D. Taylor, the chairman of the Joint Chiefs of Staff. The first 1,000 of 15,000 troops were to be withdrawn before the end of 1963. However, Kennedy's successor, Lyndon Johnson, reversed the withdrawal and there were eventually 550,000 American troops in the Vietnam War.
- A husband and wife in Kalamazoo, Michigan, became the first two of seven food poisoning deaths from botulism, caused by a single shipment of smoked whitefish that had been poorly refrigerated during its transport from the Dornbos Brothers Fisheries in Grand Rapids, Michigan, to various supermarkets in Tennessee and Michigan. Chester and Blanche Mitchell had bought the "ready to eat" whitefish during a vacation trip. Six days later, a man and his 10-year-old daughter in Knoxville, Tennessee, David and Amy Beth Cohen, died after eating the packaged fish. In all, 21 people were poisoned (including the seven who died); nearly three years later, the Kroger supermarket chain sued four trucking companies for $4,600,000 to recover for damages that it had to pay out to victims.
- Los Angeles Dodgers left-handed pitcher Sandy Koufax set a World Series record by striking out 15 New York Yankees in a 5–2 victory in Game 1 at Yankee Stadium. The record stood for exactly five years, before Bob Gibson's 17 player strikeout on October 2, 1968.

== October 3, 1963 (Thursday) ==
- Ten days before the elections scheduled for October 13, Ramón Villeda Morales was overthrown as the president of Honduras by a military coup, and deported to neighboring Costa Rica. At least 120 people were killed in fighting at Tegucigalpa and at San Pedro Sula. The leader of the coup, Colonel Oswaldo López Arellano, pledged to reschedule elections for a later date. Lopez would continue in office until 1971, after Ramon Ernesto Cruz Ucles won a presidential election, but would overthrow the Cruz government on December 4, 1972. Lopez himself would be toppled in another coup on April 22, 1975.
- Hurricane Flora reached its highest wind speed, with winds of 200 miles per hour (320 km/h), and made landfall at Haiti, where it took its highest toll. Over the next three days, 75 inches (1,900 mm) of rain fell, 5,000 Haitians were killed and 100,000 people were left homeless. Although the storm had been spotted seven days earlier, Haitian Red Cross Director Jacques Fourcand and President Francois Duvalier had prohibited the radio broadcast of any warnings, as a measure to "reduce panic". The hurricane would "spend five days crossing and recrossing Cuba" and killed 1,000 people there.

== October 4, 1963 (Friday) ==
- The U.S. Joint Chiefs of Staff coordinated with the U.S. Department of State and the Department of Defense in updating OPLAN 380-63, a plan for the invasion of Cuba that would take place during John F. Kennedy's campaign for re-election in 1964. Under the plan, Cuban exiles would infiltrate Cuba in January, American forces would follow on July 15, American air strikes would start on August 3, and "a full-scale invasion, with a goal of the installation of a government friendly to the U.S." would be launched on October 1, 1964. On the same day, Texas governor John Connally met with President Kennedy to agree upon plans for President Kennedy's trip to Texas for fundraising events and motorcades in Houston, San Antonio, Fort Worth, Dallas and Austin on November 21 and 22, 1963.
- Iraq's new prime minister, Ahmed Hassan al-Bakr, and Kuwait's prime minister, Sheikh Sabah Al-Salim Al-Sabah, signed a treaty in Baghdad. Iraq renounced territorial claims to Kuwait and the two nations agreed to establish diplomatic relations immediately. Eight days later, Kuwait would make a loan of £30 million British pounds (equivalent at the time to $84 million in U.S. dollars) which Iraq would not repay.
- U.S. First Lady Jacqueline Kennedy arrived for a visit in Greece as the guest of shipping magnate Aristotle Onassis. Following the assassination of President Kennedy, the former First Lady would marry Onassis as her second husband.
- The Vienna police force suspended Inspector Karl Silberbauer, a month after he admitted to internal investigators that he had been an officer with the Gestapo, who had personally arrested Anne Frank on August 4, 1944.
- The United Kingdom granted Gambia limited self-government, and Sir Dawda Jawara was made the chief minister. Full independence would be granted on February 18, 1965.

== October 5, 1963 (Saturday) ==
- Following a meeting with his National Security Council advisers, U.S. president Kennedy decided to withhold further American aid to the regime of South Vietnamese President Ngo Dinh Diem and his brother, Ngo Dinh Nhu, unless they implemented political reforms. With the withdrawal of U.S. support to the regime, the way was cleared for a military coup that took place on November 2.
- Before a crowd of 101,209 fans at the Melbourne Cricket Ground, the Geelong Cats defeated the Hawthorn Hawks, 109–60, to win the 67th annual Grand Final of the Victorian Football League.
- In college football, Milton College defeated visiting Lakeland College, 6–0, in the second of two experimental games, the day after Lakeland College had beaten visiting Milton College, 25–13 at its homecoming. The arrangement had been made after the two small Wisconsin colleges had discovered a mixup in their football schedules, with each set to host the other for their annual homecoming. Both games were played with 11-minute quarters instead of the regular 15, and individual player statistics were adjusted using an arithmetical formula that took the time adjustment into account, and it was agreed that if the teams split their wins, the result would be considered a tie. Thus, despite being outscored, 25–19, the Milton-Lakeland game was counted as a tie game in the Gateway Conference standings.
- At the site of the Battle of the Thames, in Chatham, Ontario, on the 150th anniversary of the death in battle of Shawnee Nation Chief Tecumseh, a monument was erected in his honor.
- Kīlauea, a volcano on Hawaii, erupted on its upper east rift zone. The eruption was observed and reported on by the Hawaiian Volcano Observatory.
- Born: Nick Robinson, British TV journalist; in Macclesfield, Cheshire

== October 6, 1963 (Sunday) ==
- Surf music, performed primarily in Southern California, received its first nationwide American television exposure, when Dick Dale and the Del-Tones appeared on The Ed Sullivan Show.
- The team of Bob Jane and Harry Firth won Australia's premier motorsport competition, the Armstrong 500 touring car race at the Mount Panorama Circuit, near Bathurst, Australia.
- The Los Angeles Dodgers swept the 1963 World Series in four straight victories over the New York Yankees, with Sandy Koufax pitching a 2–1 win at Dodger Stadium.
- Born:
  - Vasile Tarlev, 6th Prime Minister of Moldova from 2001 to 2008; in Başcalia, Moldavian SSR, Soviet Union
  - Elisabeth Shue, American film and television actress; in Wilmington, Delaware

== October 7, 1963 (Monday) ==
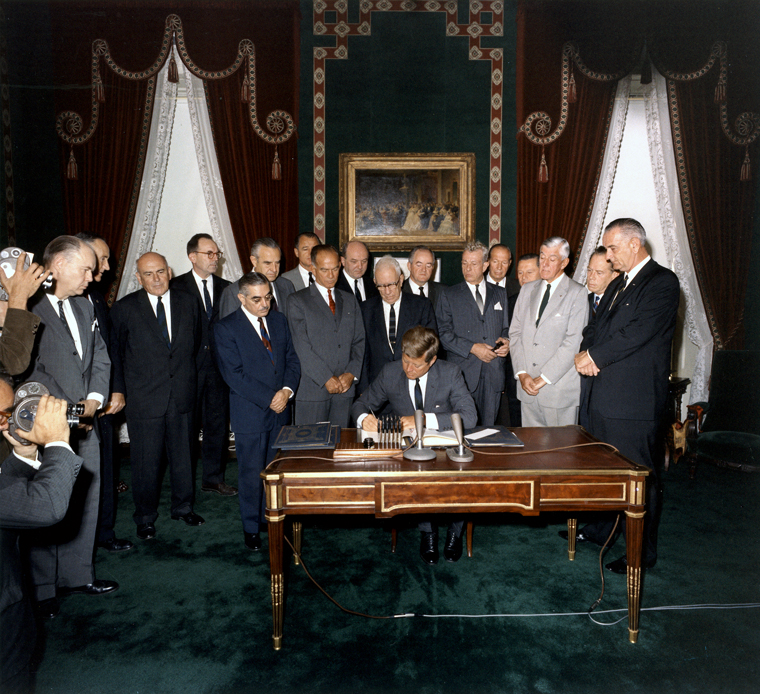
October 7, 1963: U.S. joins ban of atmospheric nuclear testing

- The very first Learjet, the Learjet 23, took off from an airport in Wichita, Kansas, with test pilots Bob Hagan and Hank Beaird at the controls. The prototype jet, the product of the investment of William P. Lear, inaugurated an era of private jet airplanes, marketed to the wealthiest of individuals.
- Amid worsening relations between the U.S. and South Vietnam over violence against the nation's Buddhist majority, outspoken South Vietnamese First Lady Madame Ngo Dinh Nhu arrived in America for a speaking tour, continuing a flurry of attacks on the Kennedy administration.
- U.S. president Kennedy signed the ratification of the Nuclear Test Ban Treaty, which went into effect on October 10 after the completion of the deposit of the signed instruments by the United States, the Soviet Union and the United Kingdom.
- Died:
  - Ivan Schmalhausen, 79, Russian zoologist and evolutionist known for postulating Schmalhausen's law, which states that a population at its limit of tolerance in one aspect is vulnerable to small differences in any other aspect, and proposed the theory of stabilizing selection.
  - Gustaf Gründgens, 63, controversial German actor and film director popular during the Nazi Era, died of an internal hemorrhage after leaving a note that said "I believe that I took too many sleeping pills. I feel a little strange. Let me sleep long."
  - Oking Jaya Atmaja, 44-45, Indonesian freedom fighter and military officer, died of an undisclosed illness.

== October 8, 1963 (Tuesday) ==
- Black artist Sam Cooke, his wife, and two members of his band were arrested after trying to register at a "whites only" motel in Shreveport, Louisiana. The charge of disturbing the peace came after the clerk told police that Cooke had continuously blown his car horn after being told that the motel was closed. That incident, and the tragic drowning of his 18-month-old son earlier in the year, led Cooke to record the classic song, "A Change Is Gonna Come". Cooke would be shot and killed at another motel in Los Angeles on December 11, 1964.
- The nations of Syria and Iraq signed the Military Unity Charter, an agreement to merge the armed forces of both countries under the command of Iraqi Defense Minister Salih Mahdi Ammash, who headed the Higher Military Council, with headquarters in Syria at Damascus. However, the agreement would not develop into a political merger between the two nations.

== October 9, 1963 (Wednesday) ==
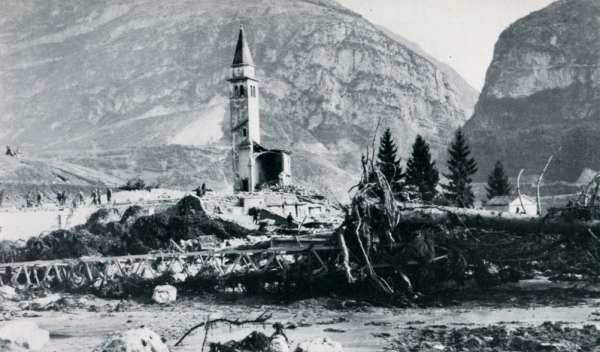
October 9, 1963: More than 2,000 in Italy killed by overflow of the Vajont Dam

- A cataclysm killed 2,043 people in a valley below the Vajont Dam in Italy, as a wave of water and mud 100-metre (330 ft) high swept over the small city of Longarone, followed by the destruction of the villages of Pirago, Villanova, Rivalta and Faè. Some estimates place the loss at 3,700. Although the dam itself did not collapse, the overflow began at 10:39 p.m. local time, after heavy rainfall led to a massive rock slope failure that caused 260,000,000 cubic meters of rock and debris to slide into the 115,000,000 cubic meters of water in the reservoir that had been created by the damming of a branch of the Piave River in Italy.
- Douglas Aircraft Company proposed a "flying carpet" escape system for a U.S. orbital space station. The escape system would be a saucer shape that would expand into a blunt-nosed, cone-shaped vehicle 7.6 metres (25 ft) across at its base. The vehicle would act as its own brake as it passed through the atmosphere. Reentry heating problems would be met by using fabrics woven with filaments of nickel-based alloys.
- Prime Minister Milton Obote declared Uganda a republic on the first anniversary of its independence from the United Kingdom. The governor-general, Sir Walter Coutts, stepped down, and the Kabaka (monarch) of Buganda, Sir Edward Mutesa II, became the nation's first president.
- Six weeks before the visit of President Kennedy to Dallas, FBI agent Marvin Gheesling removed the name of Lee Harvey Oswald from the Bureau's watch list of persons requiring surveillance.

== October 10, 1963 (Thursday) ==
- In a statement written before he underwent emergency surgery, British prime minister Harold Macmillan announced that he would resign on the grounds of ill health, and asked his Conservative Party to select his successor in time for new elections. After his doctors told him that he would be incapacitated until the end of the year, Macmillan made his decision and delivered notes to the Queen and to the foreign secretary, Lord Home (Alec Douglas-Home). Lord Home read the surprise announcement at the Conservative Party conference being held at Blackpool. Macmillan, who was in hospital at the time recovering from prostate surgery, would tell a TV interviewer a decade later that within two hours after the resignation, a government official came in to his room and took away Macmillan's official scrambler telephone, commenting "So that was the end of my power, which has never been restored."
- After conferring with FBI Director J. Edgar Hoover, U.S. attorney general Robert F. Kennedy approved wiretapping and other surveillance of the home of Dr. Martin Luther King Jr. and the New York City office of the Southern Christian Leadership Conference. Listening devices were installed in the New York office on October 24, and in Dr. King's home on November 8.
- The second James Bond film, From Russia with Love, held its world premiere at the Odeon Leicester Square in London. The film reached theaters in the United States six months later, on April 8, 1964.
- The nuclear test ban treaty, signed on August 5, went into effect.
- Born: Daniel Pearl, American investigative reporter for The Wall Street Journal, known for being kidnapped and murdered by terrorists in Pakistan while on an assignment in 2002; in Princeton, New Jersey
- Died:
  - Roy Cazaly, 70, Australian rules footballer and coach, one of the inaugural inductees into the Australian Football Hall of Fame
  - Édith Piaf, 47, French popular singer and cultural icon; of liver cancer

== October 11, 1963 (Friday) ==
- Jesuit priest Walter Ciszek, an American citizen who had been incarcerated in the Soviet Union since 1940 after being convicted of espionage, was freed after 23 years in prison. Ciszek was part of a four-person prisoner swap between the U.S. and the USSR, and was allowed to leave, along with 24-year-old college student Marvin Makinen, who had served two years of an eight-year prison sentence after being convicted of taking photographs of Soviet military installations. In return, the United States released Russian couple Ivan and Aleksandra Yegorov, who had been arrested for espionage on July 2. Ciszek's whereabouts had been unknown to the U.S. for 15 years, until 1955, when the American government had learned that he was alive and in a prison camp in Siberia.
- The United Nations General Assembly adopted resolution (XVIII), requesting the South African government to call off the Rivonia Trial and release all political prisoners, including Nelson Mandela.
- In the U.S., the President's Commission on the Status of Women issued its final reports to President John F. Kennedy, with the formal presentation coinciding with the birthday of the late Eleanor Roosevelt.
- Born: Prince Feisal bin Al Hussein of Jordan; in Amman, son of King Hussein of Jordan and Princess Muna al-Hussein
- Died: Jean Cocteau, 74, French poet, novelist, dramatist, designer, playwright, artist and filmmaker

== October 12, 1963 (Saturday) ==
- Originally scheduled to stand in for Prime Minister Macmillan in addressing the Conservative Party conference, British Deputy Prime Minister R. A. "Rab" Butler used the opportunity to attempt the "speech of his life" to urge that he was the best choice to succeed Macmillan as the party leader and as Britain's next prime minister. The speech, however, went poorly, and Butler, originally the favourite of the delegates, was no longer under serious consideration.
- In the first, and last, Latin American All-Star Game in the U.S., the best Hispanic-American players in the American and National Leagues played before 14,235 fans in the last baseball game played at the Polo Grounds in New York City. Juan Marichal and Al McBean pitched the National League to a 5–2 win over the American League. The post-season game was discontinued after the 1963 event.
- Khwaja Shams-ud-Din became Prime Minister of Jammu and Kashmir, one of the states that make up the Republic of India.
- Arturo Illia was sworn in as the 34th President of Argentina, following his victory in the presidential election of July 7.
- Died: Mark Robert Drouin, 59, Canadian politician, Speaker of the Canadian Senate from 1957 to 1962, died after an illness of several months.

== October 13, 1963 (Sunday) ==
- Four months before they came to the United States, The Beatles performed their latest hit single, "She Loves You" live on the British television variety show Sunday Night at the Palladium. Millions watched on ITV, and the enthusiasm of their fans outside the theater was so intense that the press later coined the term "Beatlemania".
- Samuel Beckett's radio play Cascando was broadcast for the first time. With music by Marcel Mihalovici, and under the direction of Roger Blin, the premiere was heard on France's public radio network, ORTF.

== October 14, 1963 (Monday) ==
- The Aden Emergency started in Radfan, South Yemen, as a revolution against British colonial rule. Backed by the United Arab Republic (Egypt), the rebels were determined to drive the British out of Aden (where they maintained military bases) and the rest of South Yemen (Federation and Protectorate of South Arabia). The last British troops would finally withdraw on November 29, 1967.
- In Irving, Texas, Ruth Paine, her friend Marina Oswald, and two neighbors were having a conversation while drinking coffee, and the subject of a job search by Marina's husband, Lee Harvey Oswald, came up. One of the neighbors, Linnie Mae Randle, mentioned that her brother had recently been hired at the Texas School Book Depository and that there might be an opening. Later in the day, Mrs. Paine telephoned the Depository and set up a job interview. On the same day, Mr. Oswald, using the name "O. H. Lee", rented a room in a house on 1026 North Beckley Avenue in Dallas.
- North American Aviation completed work on the first full-scale prototype paraglider wing for the Paraglider Landing System Program and shipped it to Ames Research Center for wind tunnel tests. Initially unsuccessful, the paraglider wing passed all tests by December. NASA's Mission Planning Coordination Group concluded that making docking rendezvous at first apogee should be provided in the mission plan for all Agena rendezvous flights.

== October 15, 1963 (Tuesday) ==
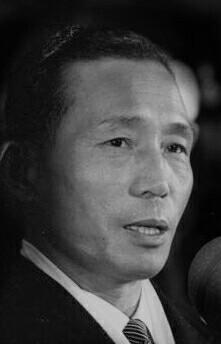
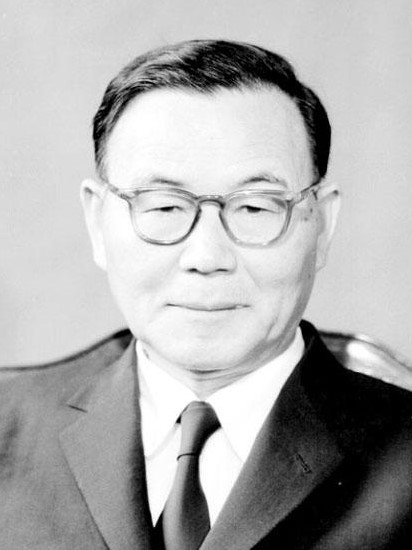
Park Chung-hee and Yun Bo-seon
- Park Chung-hee won South Korea's presidential election. The former Republic of Korea Army general, who had led a military coup in 1961, had resigned from the military to run as a civilian. Park narrowly defeated challenger Yun Bo-seon, with 4,702,640 votes (46.6%) compared to Yun's 4,546,614 (45.1%).
- Meeting at Vatican City, the Vatican ecumenical council voted overwhelmingly to allow local languages to be used in place of Latin in Roman Catholic sacraments, including those for baptism, confirmation, confession and extreme unction. Only 35 of the 2,242 prelates voted against the measure. The day before, a much broader proposal had failed to get a two-thirds plus one majority, by a margin of 78 votes.
- Konrad Adenauer, who had been Chancellor of West Germany since the creation of that nation in 1949, presented his letter of resignation to West German President Heinrich Lübke. The 87-year-old Adenauer had been preparing for retirement for several months, before announcing the date on October 11.
- At the United Nations, the United States and the Soviet Union both stated that they were in agreement with a UN Resolution to ban the placement of nuclear bombs and other weapons of mass destruction in outer space. Soviet Foreign Minister Andrei Gromyko and American ambassador to the U.N. Adlai Stevenson both said that they would vote in favor of the declaration, thus bypassing the need for the signing of a treaty between the two nations.

== October 16, 1963 (Wednesday) ==
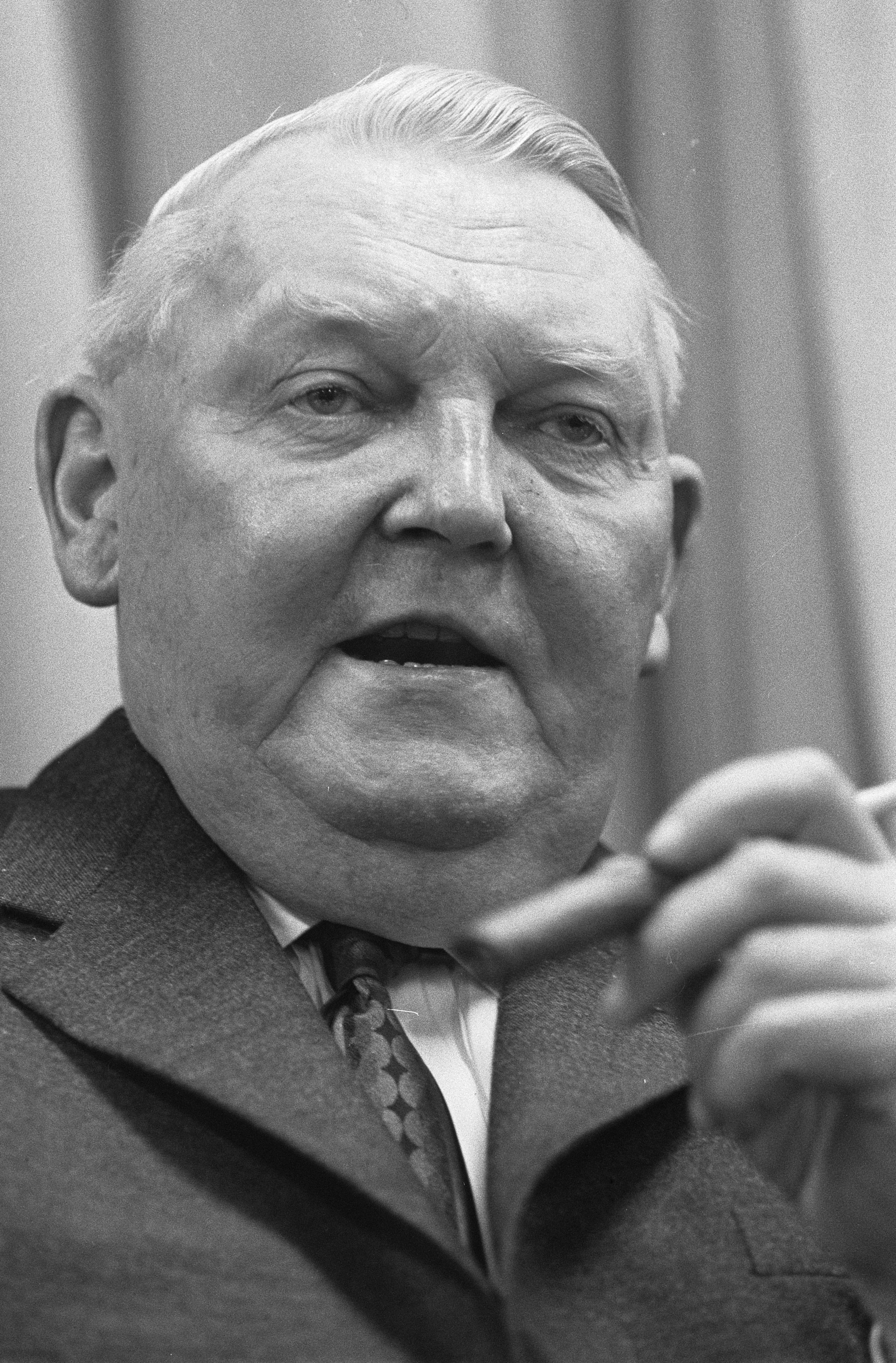
Chancellors Adenauer and Erhard
- Ludwig Erhard was sworn in as the new Chancellor of West Germany, after the Bundestag voted 279–180 to elect him as the successor to Konrad Adenauer. Erhard had served as West Germany's Economics Minister since 1949, when the nation had been created, and was "regarded as the father of West Germany's post-war economic miracle".
- The record for a flight from Tokyo to London was cut by more than half after a U.S. Air Force B-58 Hustler bomber landed at 2:34 p.m. (local time) in London after covering the 8,028-mile (12,920 km) journey in eight hours and 35 minutes. The previous mark had been set in 1955 by a British Canberra jet, which had covered the same distance in 17 hours and 42 minutes. Piloted by USAF Major Sidney G. Kubesch, the American plane also set a new record for the longest supersonic flight in history, covering the 3,524 miles (5,671 km) between Tokyo and Anchorage, Alaska, in three hours and 10 minutes, at an average speed of 1,116 miles per hour (1,796 km/h). Aerial refueling was done five times while the jet was in flight.
- At 10:30 a.m., the Texas Employment Commission attempted to notify Lee Harvey Oswald of a job opening as a baggage handler for an airline company. Earlier in the day, however, Oswald had successfully interviewed for a job at the Texas School Book Depository and had started work there. According to the Warren Commission, the airline job would have paid Oswald $100 more than his work at the book depository. The Commission wrote, "It is unlikely that he ever learned of this second opportunity". Oswald's rate of pay at the depository was $208.82 per month, payable semi-monthly in cash.
- The first pair of "Vela" satellites, designed to detect nuclear bomb detonations on Earth, were launched from Cape Canaveral, Florida, at 9:33 p.m. The satellites were placed in an orbit 60,000 miles (97,000 km) above the Earth's surface, in order to verify compliance with the Nuclear Test Ban Treaty that had recently gone into effect. The Vela program would continue until April 8, 1970, when the last of the 12 detection satellites were put into space.
- In the United States, the Nickel Plate Road, the Wabash Railroad and several smaller carriers were merged with the more profitable Norfolk & Western (N&W) Railway.

== October 17, 1963 (Thursday) ==
- In Stockholm, two Britons (Alan Lloyd Hodgkin and Andrew Fielding Huxley) and an Australian (John Carew Eccles) were announced as winners of the Nobel Prize in Physiology or Medicine "for their discoveries concerning the ionic mechanisms involved in excitation and inhibition in the peripheral and central portions of the nerve cell membrane".

== October 18, 1963 (Friday) ==
- NASA Astronaut Group 3 was introduced at a press conference in Houston. This latest addition to the astronaut corps brought to 30 the total number assigned to NASA's astronaut training center. Of the group of 14 men, described as "the most highly educated" of the three groups, two were civilians. In alphabetical order, the new astronauts (and the missions on which they would serve) were:
  - Navy Lieutenant Alan Bean (Apollo 12, Skylab 3)
  - USAF Major Edwin E. Aldrin, popularly known as Buzz Aldrin (Gemini 12, Apollo 11)
  - USAF Captain Charles Bassett (scheduled for Gemini 9, killed in 1966 plane crash)
  - Marine Corps Captain Clifton Williams (killed in 1967 plane crash)
  - USAF Captain David Scott (Gemini 8, Apollo 9, Apollo 15)
  - USAF Captain Donn Eisele (Apollo 7)
  - Navy Lieutenant Eugene Cernan (Gemini 9, Apollo 10, Apollo 17)
  - USAF Captain Michael Collins (Gemini 10 and Apollo 11)
  - Navy Lieutenant Commander Richard F. Gordon Jr. (Gemini 11, Apollo 12)
  - Navy Lieutenant Roger Chaffee (died in 1967 fire during Apollo 1 preparations)
  - Russell Schweickart, experimental astronomer at the Massachusetts Institute of Technology (Apollo 9)
  - USAF Captain Theodore Freeman (killed in 1964 plane crash)
  - Walter Cunningham, a research physicist for the Rand Corporation (Apollo 7)
  - USAF Captain William Anders (Apollo 8)

The 14 men were selected from approximately 500 military and 225 civilian applicants who had responded to NASA's request for volunteers early in May 1963. The new astronauts would report to MSC to begin training February 2, 1964.

- Félicette became the first cat sent into outer space, in a 15-minute sub-orbital flight that reached an altitude of 97 miles (156 km). After the USSR and the U.S. had successfully launched dogs and monkeys into space, France sent Félicette up in a rocket from its desert rocket base at Hammaguir in Algeria. The capsule then parachuted back to the desert and the cat was safely recovered.
- At 11 in the morning, Queen Elizabeth II met with Harold Macmillan, who had tendered his resignation as Prime Minister of the United Kingdom earlier that morning, to discuss his recommendations for a successor. Macmillan was a patient at the King Edward VII Hospital for Officers, recovering from surgery. Macmillan endorsed Alec Douglas-Home as the most acceptable choice to form a new government. Macmillan had resigned after having been incorrectly diagnosed with inoperable prostate cancer. He later charged that he had been hounded from office by a backbench minority, "a band that in the end does not amount to more than 15 or 20 at the most". Far from terminally ill, Macmillan would live for another 23 years, until his death in 1986 at the age of 92.
- The 1968 Olympic Games were awarded to Mexico City by the International Olympic Committee during its meeting at Baden-Baden in West Germany. The other three candidates that had submitted bids had been Detroit (U.S.), Lyon (France) and Buenos Aires (Argentina).
- Died: Constance Worth (stage name for Enid Joyce Howarth), 51, Australian film actress known for The Squatter's Daughter (as Jocelyn Howarth in 1933 in Australia) and The Wages of Sin (as Constance Worth in 1938 in the U.S.); her death from anemia was reportedly "surrounded by unhappy circumstances."

== October 19, 1963 (Saturday) ==
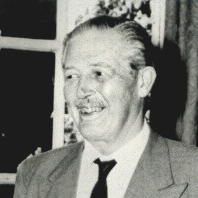
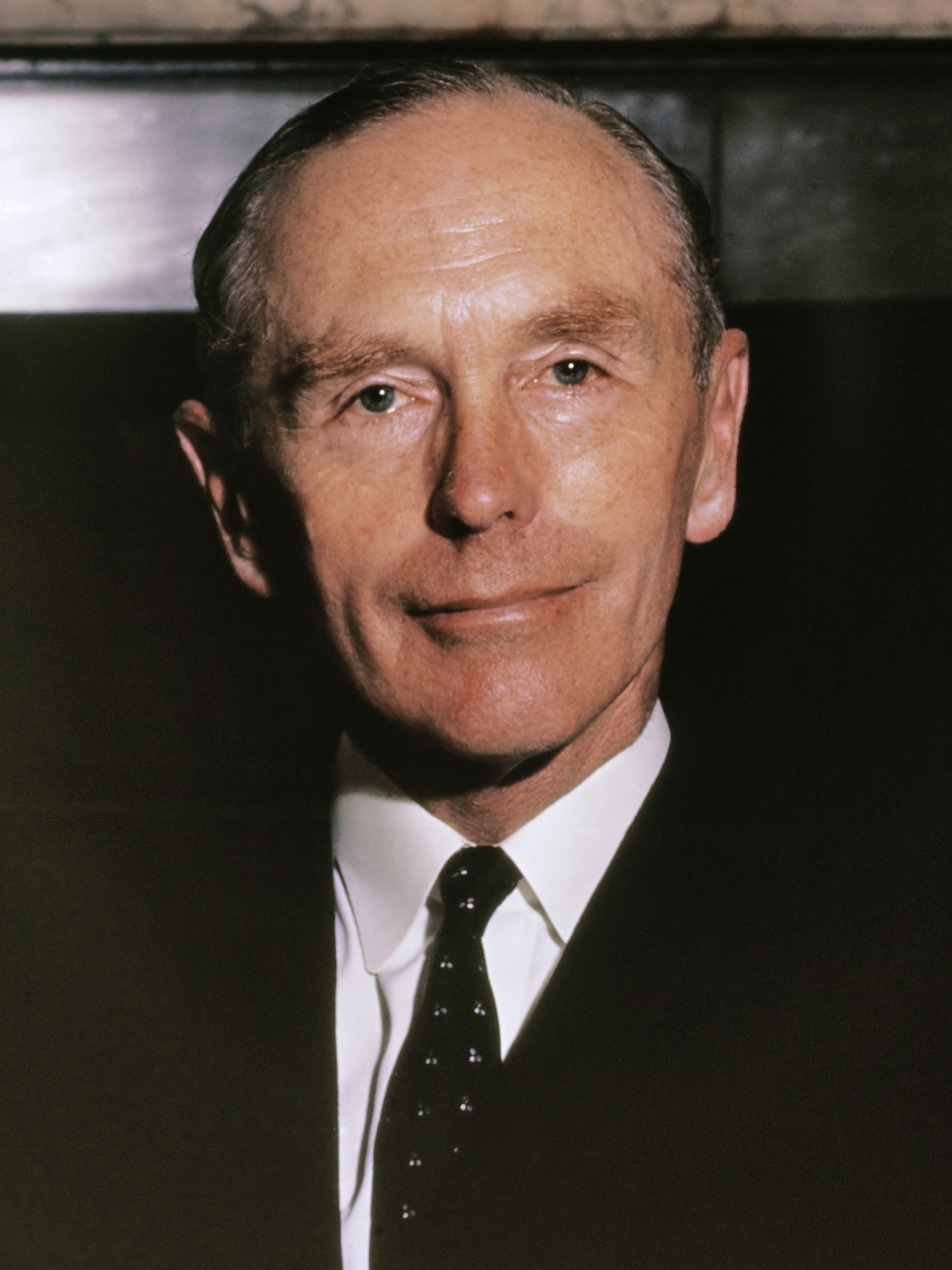
Harold Macmillan and Alec Douglas-Home
- At 12:56 p.m., Buckingham Palace announced that Queen Elizabeth had formally invited the 14th Earl of Home to succeed Harold Macmillan as the new prime minister of the United Kingdom. He was the first member of the nobility since Robert Gascoyne-Cecil, 3rd Marquess of Salisbury (1895–1902), to serve as prime minister, and "the only man in modern times to do so without a seat in either house of Parliament", having resigned from the House of Lords to run as a candidate for a by-election to the House of Commons. Three of Home's rivals within the Conservative Party, each of whom had aspired to the premiership, agreed to serve in his cabinet. Deputy Prime Minister R. A. "Rab" Butler, Chancellor of the Exchequer Reginald Maudling, and Viscount Hailsham joined Home in order to form a government in advance of the 1964 elections.

== October 20, 1963 (Sunday) ==
- In the East German general election, voters voted in favor of the list of 434 candidates for the 434 seats listed on the ballot by the National Front. While the 434 candidates for the Volkskammer were nominally from nine different political parties, the choice was limited to approving or rejecting the National Front list in its entirety. In addition, starting with the 1963 election, the SED Party always held 110 seats in parliament; when the number of available was increased to 500, the SED had a similar proportion, 127 seats. As one author noted later, "Normally voters merely dropped their unmarked ballot paper in to the box, since in order to dissent it was necessary to cross out each name individually, and that required displaying one's non-conformity by going into a booth." Of the 11,533,859 votes cast, 99.95% were in favor of the list, while 0.05%-- less than 6,000—were no votes.
- Died:
  - Diana Churchill, 54, eldest daughter of British statesman Sir Winston Churchill and Clementine Churchill, died from an overdose of barbiturates.
  - Soren Sorensen Adams, 84, Danish-born American inventor of the "joy buzzer" and founder of the S.S. Adams Co. manufacturer of novelty items.

== October 21, 1963 (Monday) ==
- The last of the "cursed soldiers", resistance fighters who fought against the Communist regime in Poland, was located and killed in a gun battle with a unit of the ZOMO, the Polish secret police. Betrayed by a relative of his girlfriend, Józef Franczak was found hiding near Lublin, in the village of Majdan Kozic Górnych. Franczak fired at the ZOMO officers rather than be arrested. After the fall of the Communist regime in Poland, a monument would be erected in his honor.
- Cuba began a large-scale military presence in Africa, with the arrival of the first of 2,200 soldiers and 1,000 advisers in Algeria. Commanded by General Efigenio Ameijeiras, the group (along with fifty T-55 tanks and several MiG-17 fighters) was brought on three merchant ships to the port of Oran in order to assist in the war against Morocco.
- The term "Beatlemania" was first used in print, coined for the headline in a feature story for the London tabloid The Daily Mail. The feature story on the group's popularity, written by Vincent Mulchrone, carried the headline "This Beatlemania". On November 2, another London paper, The Daily Mirror, reported on a concert the night before, in a news story with the headline "BEATLEMANIA! It's happening everywhere... even in sedate Cheltenham".
- The Last Savage, an opera by composer Gian Carlo Menotti, was performed for the first time. The premiere took place at the Théâtre national de l'Opéra-Comique in Paris. Originally written in Italian, then translated into French and into English for audiences in Paris and in New York, the opera was poorly received by critics and by the public.
- Sir Seewoosagur Ramgoolam continued in office as the Chief Minister of the Indian Ocean island nation of Mauritius, after his Labour Party won 19 of the 40 parliamentary seats in the Mauritian general election.
- Died:
  - Jean Decoux, 79, French Navy Admiral and Governor-General of French Indochina from 1940 to 1945
  - Kurt Wolff, 76, German-born publisher and co-founder of Pantheon Books

== October 22, 1963 (Tuesday) ==
- The prototype of the BAC 1–11 airliner crashed during flight testing, killing all seven of the people on board, including test pilot M. J. Lithgow. Investigation of the accident revealed that it resulted from a deep stall" caused by the aircraft assuming an unexpected and dangerously high angle of attack. The remedial measures— most notably, the "stick shaker" that became a feature of all large commercial and military aircraft—were of great use worldwide in designing aircraft that had a T-tail and rear-mounted engine configuration.
- The 741-foot (226 m) tall Bhakra Dam (only 2 feet (0.61 m) shorter than the Hoover Dam) was completed in India and dedicated by Prime Minister Jawaharlal Nehru, who told his audience, "This dam has been built up with the unrelenting toil of man for the benefit of mankind and therefore is worthy of worship. May you call it a Temple or a Gurdwara or a Mosque, it inspires our admiration and reverence." A reported 150 workers had died during the dam's construction. Located in northern India in the state of Himachal Pradesh, the dam created the largest freshwater reservoir in the history of India up to that time.
- An estimated 159,000 students—one-third of the children in Chicago's public schools—boycotted classes in protest of school districting that created de facto racial segregation. Combined with the usual number of students who were absent for other reasons, 224,770 of the 469,733 pupils registered did not attend classes. Of the 469,733 pupils registered in the Chicago public schools, 224,770 stayed home on Tuesday. The single-day loss to the school board for state funds was $470,000—the equivalent of $3.6 million in 2015.
- The Nevada Gaming Control Board rescinded the gambling license issued to entertainer Frank Sinatra, and forced the closure of his Cal-Neva Casino at Crystal Bay, Nevada, at Lake Tahoe. Sinatra, whom the Board had tied to organized crime because mobster Sam Giancana had stayed at the Cal-Neva resort, would spend the next 18 years trying to regain his license, finally succeeding in 1981.
- The National Theatre of Great Britain staged its first production, presenting Hamlet, starring Peter O'Toole, under the direction of Laurence Olivier. The National Theatre's company did not yet have a building of its own, so William Shakespeare's play was performed at the Royal Victorian Theatre, nicknamed "The Old Vic".
- A group of 13 business people incorporated the Communications Satellite Corporation, known as COMSAT and chaired by Phil Graham, the publisher of The Washington Post. The group then set about to raise $500,000,000 in the sale of private stock.

== October 23, 1963 (Wednesday) ==
- Alec Douglas-Home, 14th Earl of Home and Prime Minister of the United Kingdom, disclaimed his peerage in order to become a candidate for the House of Commons in the November 7 by-election for Kinross and West Perthshire. The Glasgow Herald commented earlier that "There is no constitutional objection to a peer becoming Prime Minister. In practice, however, it would be unacceptable nowadays— indeed, there was a great deal of opposition to Lord Home's appointment as foreign secretary, just because he was not a member of the House of Commons."
- Before a crowd of more than 100,000 at Wembley Stadium, a friendly soccer match was played to celebrate the centennial of the founding of the Football Association in England. With four minutes left in the game, England defeated a "Rest of the World" team, 2–1, on a goal by Jimmy Greaves of Tottenham Hotspur. The Rest players came from Russia, Brazil, West Germany, Czechoslovakia, France, Scotland, Portugal, Spain, and Yugoslavia.
- The Spanish ship SS Juan Ferrer capsized and sank near Boscawen Point, United Kingdom, with the loss of 11 of the 15 crew.

== October 24, 1963 (Thursday) ==
- On the third anniversary of the Nedelin catastrophe of October 24, 1960, when more than 100 military observers were killed by the launch pad explosion of an R-16 ballistic missile, and at the same firing range at Baikonur, seven military personnel were killed when a fire broke out at an R-9 missile silo. "After that incident," author Boris Chertok wrote later, "24 October was considered bad luck at the firing range. Tacitly, it became a day off from work, and military testers even avoided serious domestic chores at home."
- At a press conference in Hartford, Connecticut, U.S. senator Barry Goldwater of Arizona answered reporters' questions about a possible run for the U.S. presidency in 1964. Washington Post reporter Chalmers Roberts asked him for his reaction to a suggestion, by former President Eisenhower, that the six American divisions in Western Europe could be reduced to one. "American forces there could probably be cut by at least one-third", Goldwater was quoted as saying, "if NATO commanders had the power to use nuclear weapons on their own initiative in an emergency." The next day, Roberts's report of the interview ran in the Post with the headline, "Goldwater Backs Army Cuts Abroad: Would Give NATO Commanders Power to Use A-Weapons". Goldwater later maintained that he had been misquoted, and that he had said that the commander of NATO should continue to have such authority; the statement came back to haunt him during his 1964 campaign.
- An underground iron mine flooded in Lengede, West Germany, with 129 men inside after a sedimentation pond gave way. Seventy-nine escaped immediately, and another seven were reached by a drill bit, but the other 43 remained trapped and appeared to have drowned. In the days to come, more miners were rescued but the survival of anyone else appeared unlikely. Two weeks after the disaster, however, 11 miners were rescued alive on November 7, after being pulled to the surface with the aid of a bomb-shaped cylinder known as the "Dahlbusch Bomb" (Dahlbuschbombe).
- The UK government accepted the conclusions of the Robbins Report on higher education. The report recommended immediate expansion of universities, and that all Colleges of Advanced Technology should be given university status. At the time, less than five percent of all British school graduates went on to a university education, and less than one percent of female graduates continued their studies at a university. On the fiftieth anniversary of the Robbins Report, however, it was noted that almost half of young British students were enrolled in college.
- In partial settlement of a controversy between the governments of the United States and Panama over the American-controlled Panama Canal Zone, the Panamanian flag was raised for the first time within the Zone, the first of 17 to be flown next to the U.S. flag in public places. After the last flagpole and flag was placed, on February 7, 1964, "at all other public places, including schools," an author noted later, "the U.S. flag was lowered and the flagpoles remained empty."
- The French aerospace research centre launched the sixth and final Topaze VE111C rocket from Hammaguir, Algeria. The VE111C was retired in favor of the next generation of Topaze rockets, the VE111L.
- Born: Giselle Laronde, Trinidadian beauty queen and Miss World 1986; in Port of Spain, Trinidad and Tobago

== October 25, 1963 (Friday) ==
- In a possible break with a 16-century-old tradition, the Vatican Ecumenical Council voted 2,057 to 5 in favor of a resolution stating that it did not oppose a fixed annual date for Easter, so long as the change was acceptable to other Christian churches in addition to the Roman Catholic Church. During the spring of 325 AD, the First Council of Nicaea had adopted the rule that Easter would be celebrated on the first Sunday after the first full moon after March 21, the spring equinox. "Many biblical scholars reckon Christ's resurrection, the first Easter, as April 9, 30 A.D.", a report noted, suggesting that the annual observation of Easter would most likely be on the second Sunday in April.
- Trading stamps were introduced for the first time in Taiwan, with Finance Minister (and future president) C. K. Yen officiating at a ceremony in Taipei to inaugurate a government department that would oversee 70 companies that would offer the stamps based on spending at supermarkets. Popular in the United States and elsewhere at the time, the trading stamps could be pasted into books and redeemed for merchandise.
- North American Aviation finished modifying the Advanced Paraglider Trainer to a full scale tow test vehicle (TTV) and shipped it to Edwards Air Force Base for tow tests to begin on December 28. Installation of flightworthy control system hardware would be accomplished within six months.
- Died:
  - Karl von Terzaghi, 80, Austrian civil engineer and geologist who was known as "the father of soil mechanics"
  - Björn Thórdarson, 84, 9th Prime Minister of Iceland from 1942 to 1944
  - Roger Désormière, 65, French classical music conductor

== October 26, 1963 (Saturday) ==
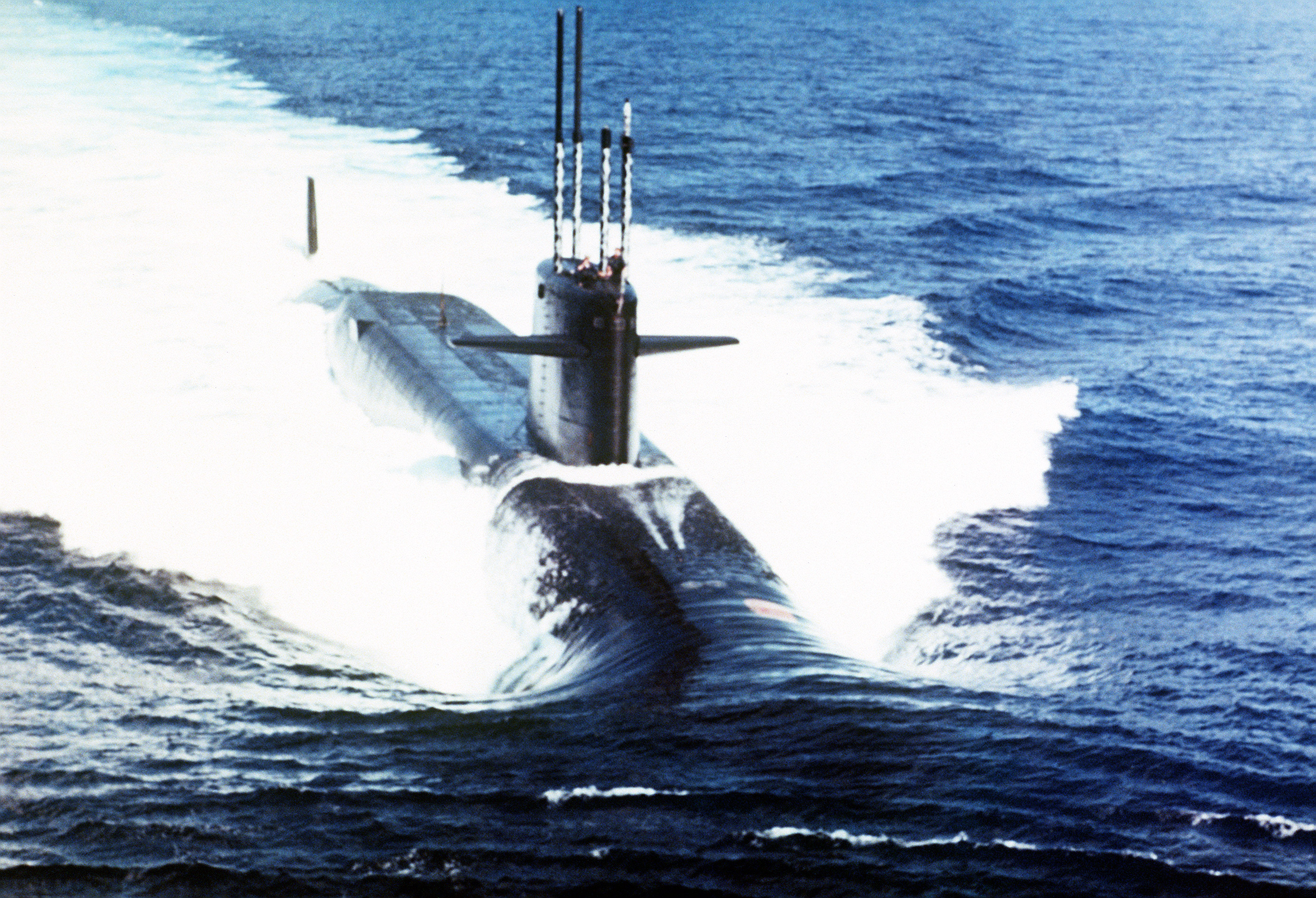
October 26, 1963: Sub-launched nuclear missiles can now strike target "anywhere on Earth"

- For the first time, it was possible for a nuclear weapon to be carried by a missile capable of reaching any land target on Earth. At 11:14 a.m., the new Polaris A-3 missile was successfully fired from the nuclear submarine USS Andrew Jackson, submerged 50 feet (15 m) below the ocean surface off the coast of Cape Canaveral, Florida. After being fired, the unarmed warhead splashed down in a target area 2,300 miles (3,700 km) away. Although no missile has the range of 12,450 miles (20,040 km) (half the circumference of the Earth), The Age, published in Melbourne, Australia, noted that "No point of land is more than 1800 miles from a seacoast," adding that the missile "will be able to strike at ranges up to 2880 miles — giving the launching submarines hundreds of cubic miles of ocean in which to hide."
- Soviet prime minister Nikita Khrushchev announced, through the publication of an interview in the government newspaper Izvestia, that the Soviets were not going to compete with the United States in the race to put the first man on the Moon. "At the present time, we do not plan flights of cosmonauts to the Moon," he said. "I have read a report that the Americans wish to land a man on the Moon by 1970. Well, let's wish them success."
- In the U.S., the Des Moines Register of Iowa published a report by its investigative reporter Clark Mollenhoff, headlined "U.S. Expels Girl Linked to Officials— Is Sent to Germany After FBI Probe". Mollenhoff broke the story of Ellen Rometsch, who had recently been deported to West Germany. Rometsch and her family had fled from East Germany in 1955. Mollenhoff's report noted that she was expected to be called to testify before a U.S. Senate subcommittee and added that "The evidence also is likely to include identification of several high executive branch officials as friends and associates" of "the part-time model and party girl". Under suspicion that she was working for East German or Soviet intelligence, Miss Rometsch had been forced to leave the U.S. on August 22, 1963, after an FBI investigation. According to one biographer, "Mollenhoff's story horrified President Kennedy", and Rometsch had "visited the President at least ten times in the spring and summer of 1963", while another historian concluded that the FBI never had "any solid evidence" that Rometsch had sexual relations with Kennedy.
- At Hampden Park in Glasgow; Rangers F.C. defeated Greenock Morton F.C. 5–0, to win the Scottish League Cup. Jim Forrest scored four of the five goals, all within the last 37 minutes of the game.
- The rocket for the launch of Gemini 1 arrived at Atlantic Missile Range and was transferred to complex 19.
- Born:
  - Natalie Merchant, American singer-songwriter for 10,000 Maniacs and as a solo artist; in Jamestown, New York
  - Tom Cavanagh, Canadian TV actor; in Ottawa
  - Craig Shakespeare, English footballer with 525 games in Football League play, and briefly the coach of Leicester City; in Birmingham (died of cancer, 2024)

== October 27, 1963 (Sunday) ==
- The "green light" telegram, which effectively cleared the way for the overthrow of South Vietnam President Ngo Dinh Diem, was received in Saigon by U.S. ambassador Henry Cabot Lodge Jr. The substance of the cable, approved by U.S. Under Secretary of State George W. Ball, was that it was "authorizing Ambassador Lodge to signal that we would not oppose a coup against Diem", according to Ball's Deputy, U. Alexis Johnson. Johnson later recalled that he and Ball had been playing golf when "Averell Harriman and Roger Hilsman interrupted our game, and they gave him a telegram to sign". The cable was the followup to Cable 243, sent on August 24, that had instructed Lodge to pressure the Ngo brothers to resign.
- An early morning fire destroyed nearly all of the records at the Colgate University Administration Building. Most of the records were irreplaceable.
- Jimmy Tarbuck made his first appearance at the London Palladium.

== October 28, 1963 (Monday) ==
- Hubert Maga, the president of the west African nation of Dahomey (now Benin), was overthrown by his Army chief of staff, General Christophe Soglo, after strikes and protests had erupted across the nation. According to Ryszard Kapuściński, a Western observer who happened to be in the capital at Porto-Novo, General Soglo arrested President Maga, had his troops surround a building where the members of Maga's cabinet had fled, and then "announced through a megaphone that if the cabinet did not resign by four in the afternoon, he would begin firing on the building". The Dahomeyan army's lone heavy weapon was a mortar, and General Soglo "was the only one in the army who knew how to operate it". Kapuściński notes that "the cabinet decided unanimously to resign".

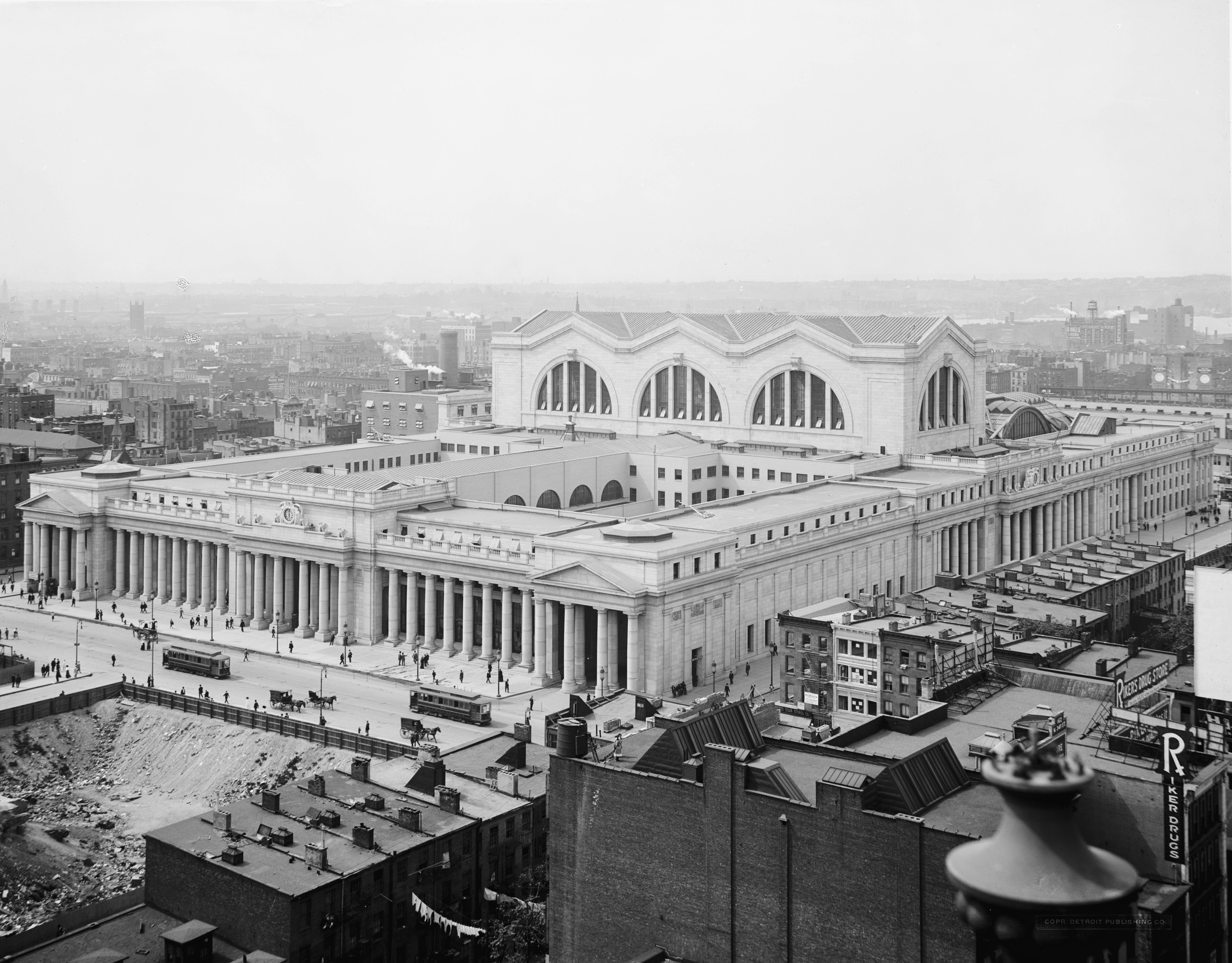
New York's massive Penn Station

- Demolition of Penn Station, one of the famous landmarks of New York City, began at 9:00 in the morning as a wrecking crew arrived at what had once been the world's largest railroad terminal. Penn Station had been opened in 1910 by the Pennsylvania Railroad Company, but closed decades later after the bankruptcy of Penn Central. The tearing down of the structure, which occupied more than seven acres between 31st and 33rd Street, and Seventh and Eighth Avenue, would finally be completed in 1966.

== October 29, 1963 (Tuesday) ==
- Hurricane Ginny reached peak winds of 110 mph (175 km/h), subsequently becoming extratropical before making landfall on southwestern Nova Scotia, Canada.
- Died: Adolphe Menjou, 73, American actor

== October 30, 1963 (Wednesday) ==
- Morocco and Algeria agreed to a ceasefire in the Sand War, effective November 2, after mediation by Ethiopia's Emperor Haile Selassie and Mali's president Modibo Keita at the capital of Mali, Bamako. Under the Bamako Agreement, the Organization of African Unity (OAU) would oversee the arbitration of the boundary dispute between the two warring nations, with the Treaty of Ifrane being signed on June 15, 1969, and the frontiers being determined by the Rabat Agreements of June 15, 1972.
- In an attempt to fix problems with the ballute (balloon and parachute) ejection seat for Gemini astronauts, Gemini Project Office directed McDonnell Aircraft to study increasing the diameter of the system, lengthening the riser lines, and adding a system of automatic separation of the ejection seat backboard from the egress kit before touchdown. Wind tunnel test data had suggested that the ballute would fail at supersonic speeds and would not open at subsonic speeds.
- The auto manufacturing firm Lamborghini was incorporated, days before the first of its sports cars was unveiled at the Turin Auto Show.
- Died: Domhnall Ua Buachalla (Donal Buckley), 97, the third and last Governor-General of the Irish Free State, who served from 1932 to 1936

== October 31, 1963 (Thursday) ==
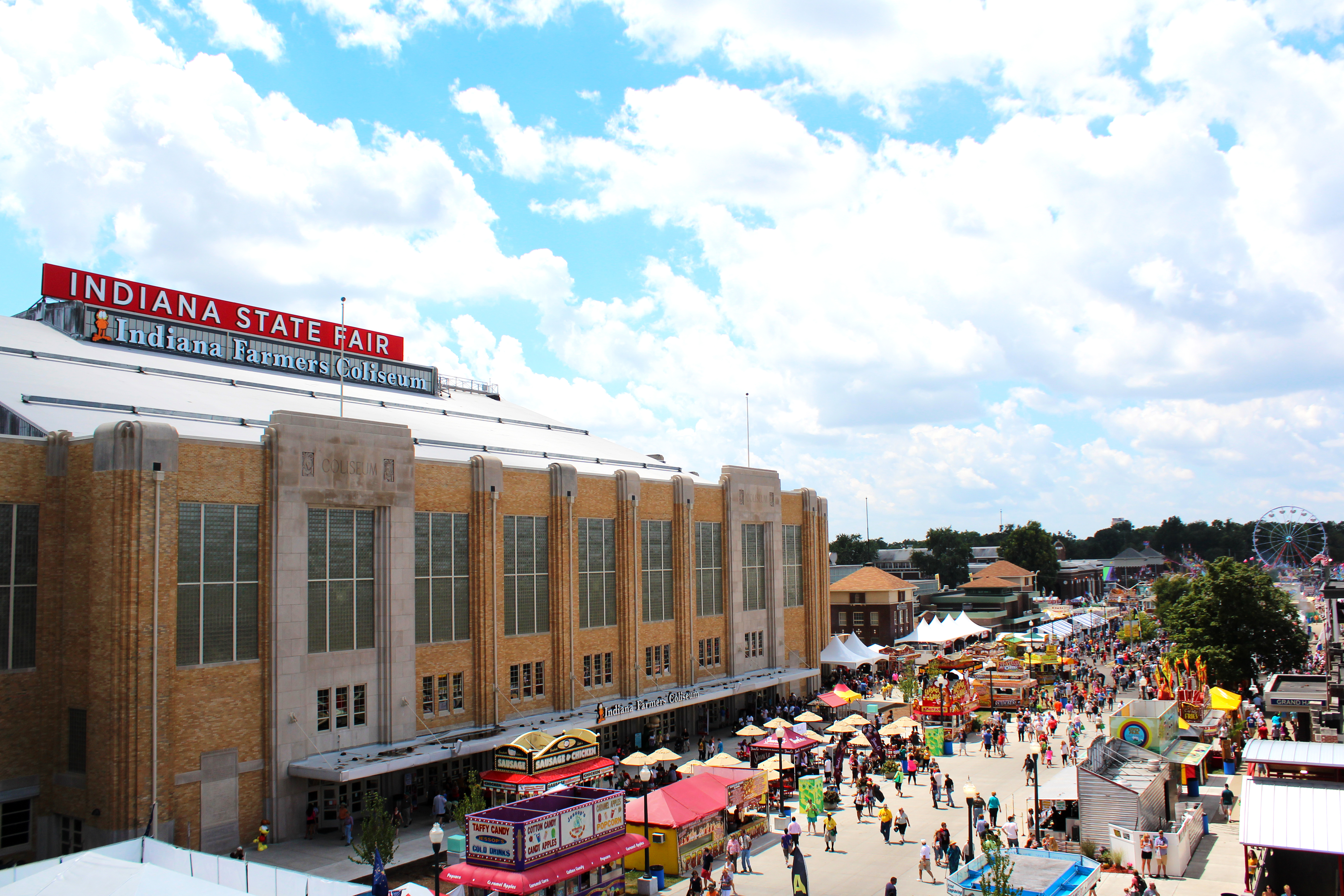
October 31, 1963: 74 killed in Coliseum explosion in Indianapolis

Plaque honoring the victims who died in the explosion

- A pair of propane gas tank explosions killed 74 people at the Indiana State Fair Coliseum in Indianapolis. The blast took place in the closing minutes of the Holiday on Ice hosted at the indoor facility. The show had started at 8:45 p.m., 15 minutes late, and the last act, "A Salute to Mardi Gras", was in progress when the blast occurred. Beneath the box seats at Aisle 13 on the south side of the Coliseum, a propane tank with a faulty valve had been causing gas to accumulate near one of the concession stands. The tank fell over near an electric heater, and at 11:04 that night. A fiery blast followed, bringing chunks of concrete down upon the crowd. Some people had survived the initial explosion and were killed moments later by a second one. Of the victims, 47 were killed instantly, and another 27 died later, and 400 more suffered non-fatal injuries. Although indictments were issued for various government and private officials, nobody was ever tried or convicted for negligence.
- President Kennedy signed the Community Mental Health Act, creating federally funded community centers that would treat mental illness on an outpatient basis, as a replacement for the state institutions where intellectually disabled and chronically mentally ill patients had been living. In retrospect, however, the well-intended legislation had two major flaws, as noted by author E. Fuller Torrey. "It encouraged the closing of state mental hospitals without any realistic plan regarding what would happen to the discharged patients, especially those who refused the medication they needed to remain well," Torrey notes, and "It included no plan for the future funding of the mental health centers," with federal aid ceasing after 1970.
- In fiction, the Halloween horror movie franchise storyline begins with the first murder committed by Michael Myers, a six-year-old child in the mythical town of Haddonfield, Illinois. Young Michael spends the next fifteen years in an asylum, escaping on October 30, 1978, to renew his killing spree.
- Born:
  - Rob Schneider, American actor and comedian; in San Francisco
  - Fred McGriff, American baseball player; in Tampa, Florida
