= November 1963 =

Month of 1963

<<	November 1963					>>
Su	Mo	Tu	We	Th	Fr	Sa
					1	2
3	4	5	6	7	8	9
10	11	12	13	14	15	16
17	18	19	20	21	22	23
24	25	26	27	28	29	30

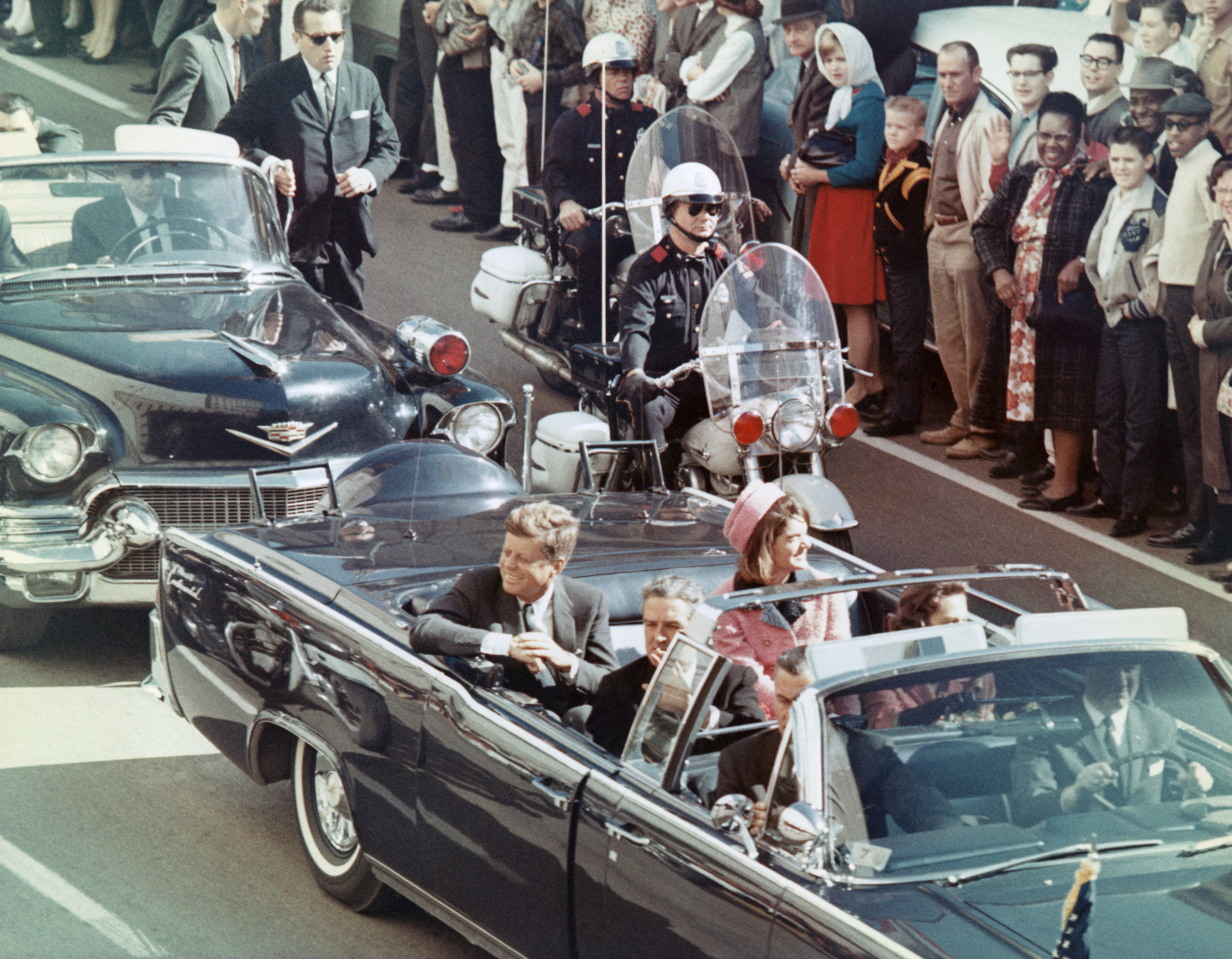
November 22, 1963: President Kennedy moments before he was assassinated

The following events occurred in November 1963:

== November 1, 1963 (Friday) ==
- At 1:15 p.m. in Saigon, three Marine battalions of South Vietnam began their seizure of communications throughout the capital city, taking control of the city's radio stations, national and municipal police stations, and the public and Defense Ministry telecommunications centers. The acts were the first in a coup d'état against President Ngo Dinh Diem and his brother Ngo Dinh Nhu. The planners had set a deadline of 1:15 to either begin the coup or to call it off, and were waiting until visiting U.S. Admiral Harry Felt had departed. Admiral Felt's airplane took off at 1:00 p.m. Diem and Nhu quietly escaped Gia Long Palace by 8:00 p.m. and fled to refuge at the Roman Catholic church in the nearby Cholon section of the city.
- In the first test of the type of rocket to be used by U.S. astronauts in the Gemini program, Titan II development flight N-25 was launched from the Atlantic Missile Range. The modified Titan II missile carried an oxidizer surge chamber and fuel accumulator kit to reduce the amplitude of longitudinal vibration, a problem in earlier flights, to less than 0.25g, the maximum level tolerable in human spaceflight. The N-25 flight achieved a vibration level of 0.22g, within acceptable limits. Two later Titan II rocket flights would confirm that the surge chamber and accumulator kit had solved the problem.
- In the mountains of Puerto Rico, the Arecibo Observatory, along with the world's largest fixed-reflector radar and radio telescope, were officially dedicated. Assistant U.S. Secretary of Defense formally accepted the instrument for use by the DOD's Advanced Research Projects Agency.
- Lennox Madikane, Mxolisi Dam'ane and Felix Jaxa, three African National Congress (ANC) members who had been convicted of violating South Africa's Sabotage Act of 1962 for inciting riots at Paarl the year before, were hanged at Robben Island prison.
- Born: Rick Allen, English drummer who plays for the hard rock band Def Leppard; in Dronfield, Derbyshire
- Died: Elsa Maxwell, 80, American gossip columnist and socialite

== November 2, 1963 (Saturday) ==
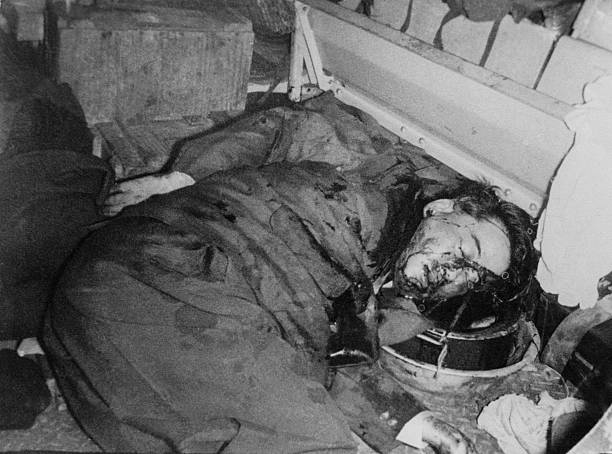
November 2, 1963: Corpse of President Ngo Dinh Diem

- At 6:37 a.m., guards defending the Presidential Palace in Saigon raised the white flag of surrender after more than two hours of shelling by rebels within the South Vietnam military, but found that President Ngo Dinh Diem and his brother, Ngo Dinh Nhu, had slipped out of the surrounded building, apparently through a tunnel that emerged at a beauty parlor several blocks away. Around 8:00 a.m., witnesses outside the St. Francis Xavier Church in Cholon recognized Diem and Nhu, who had asked church authorities to notify the rebels that they were willing to surrender. The coup leader, General Duong Van Minh, sent a convoy to pick up the Ngo brothers, and General Mai Huu Xuan oversaw their arrest. After promising them safe conduct into exile, General Xuan had both men step into an M113 armored personnel carrier at 9:45 a.m. Reports differ as to whether the act was committed inside the APC by their captor, Captain Nguyễn Văn Nhung, or by General Xuan after torture at the National Police headquarters, but the Ngo brothers were tortured and then shot to death. The official announcement from the rebels on Radio Saigon, however, was that both men had committed suicide.
- U.S. President John F. Kennedy was scheduled to be driven in a motorcade in Chicago, along Jackson Boulevard and Michigan Avenue en route to the Hilton Hotel, and then to watch college football's annual Army–Navy Game, being held that year at Soldier Field. That morning, however, Kennedy abruptly canceled the trip, and announced that he would remain at the White House to confer with advisers about events in South Vietnam.
- Born: Borut Pahor, President of Slovenia from 2012 to 2022 and Prime Minister of Slovenia from 2008 to 2012; in Postojna, SR Slovenia, Yugoslavia

== November 3, 1963 (Sunday) ==
- Barry E. Steiner, a 20-year old medical student at Boston University, was arrested at Chicago's O'Hare International Airport after having flown hundreds of thousands of miles on stolen airplane tickets. In 1963, it was commonplace to purchase a ticket at the airline counter, have the ticket agent fill it out, and then to board the airplane. Steiner's method was simply to reach behind an unattended counter at an airport, steal blank tickets, write in the flight number and destination of his choice, and then walk on to the appropriate plane. To avoid suspicion, he carried an authentic-looking Federal Aviation Administration badge and posed as an FAA official if needed.
- In "the most fair election ever to be held in Greece", as the British Embassy in Athens described it, voters brought Centre Union (Enosis Kentrou or EK) party leader Georgios Papandreou into office as Prime Minister. No party got a majority of the seats in Parliament, but the EK ended up with a 138 to 132 lead (out of 338 seats) over the National Radical Union (Ethniki Rizospastiki Enosis or ERE) party of incumbent Premier Konstantinos Karamanlis.
- Soviet cosmonauts Andriyan Nikolayev and Valentina Tereshkova, who had been launched into space aboard Vostok 3 and Vostok 6, respectively, were married in Moscow in a ceremony attended by Party Secretary Khrushchev and other prominent government leaders. They had a daughter seven months later, and separated before the end of 1964, officially divorcing in 1982.
- Born: Davis Guggenheim, American film director and producer; in St. Louis

== November 4, 1963 (Monday) ==
- The U.S. Secret Service concluded that the more secure and the larger of two locations for President Kennedy's fundraising luncheon in Dallas would be the "Women's Building" at Fair Park at the east side of downtown, rather than the Trade Mart on the west side near Dealey Plaza. Despite the recommendations of Chief Gerald Behn of the White House detail, and Dallas field office agent Forrest Sorrels, the state Democratic Party leaders in Texas settled on the Trade Mart. "[A] different destination for the motorcade," author Vincent Bugliosi would write later, "would have meant a different route altogether, and no assassination."
- The Beatles appeared before the British royal family as "the seventh of nineteen acts" in the annual Royal Variety Performance at the Prince of Wales Theatre in London, and played a set of four songs. After the show, the "Fab Four" were greeted by Queen Elizabeth II, and had conversations with the Queen Mother (Queen Elizabeth II's mother), Princess Margaret and Lord Snowden. The event was taped, and the televised broadcast on November 11 would be watched by what was then a record 26 million viewers.
- Major General Duong Van Minh, and the other leaders of the new government of South Vietnam, approved "a hastily drawn provisional charter" to replace the 1956 Constitution, and giving the Revolutionary Military Council all executive and legislative power.
- The Sand War, a border dispute between Algeria and Morocco, finally came to an end, five days after the signing of a cease-fire agreement, with the mediation of a monitoring officer from Mali.
- Born: Lena Zavaroni, Scottish singer (d. 1999); in Greenock, Renfrewshire
- Died: Carlos Magalhães de Azeredo, 91, Brazilian poet, short story writer, diplomat and journalist

== November 5, 1963 (Tuesday) ==
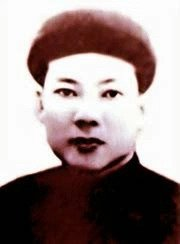
Ngo Dinh Can

- Ngo Dinh Can, the last member of the Ngo political family remaining in South Vietnam, was handed over to the new government on orders of U.S. Ambassador Henry Cabot Lodge Jr., after an American military plane transported him to Saigon from Huế, where he had sought refuge at the American consulate. Put on trial for murder, the unpopular Can, who had ruled Central Vietnam as a dictator during the regime of his brother, President Ngo Dinh Diem, would be executed by a firing squad six months later.
- McDonnell Aircraft Corporation reviewed work on the beryllium shingles to be used for the heat shield of the Gemini spacecraft, after a labor strike at Pioneer Astro Industries had delayed shingle tests. The finished shingles had problems with flaking, lamination, and cracking, and the decision was made to substitute chemical etching for machine tooling wherever possible and to use lighter cuts where machine tooling was unavoidable.
- Giovanni Leone resigned as Prime Minister of Italy six months after forming a minority government. President Antonio Segni requested Leone to remain on the job until a successor could be found to form a new cabinet of ministers.
- Born:
  - Andrea McArdle, American child actress and singer known for portraying "Annie" in the Broadway musical of the same name; in Philadelphia
  - Tatum O'Neal, American child actress and Academy Award winner known for portraying "Addie" in the film Paper Moon; in Los Angeles
  - Yair Lapid, Leader of the Opposition in Israel since 2023; in Tel Aviv

== November 6, 1963 (Wednesday) ==
- In Midland, Texas, 17-year old Laura Welch, who would later marry George W. Bush and become the First Lady upon his inauguration as President of the United States, ran a stop sign at the intersection of Farm to Market Road 868 and Big Spring Street, and crashed into the side of a car driven by one of her classmates at Robert E. Lee High School, 17-year old Michael Dutton Douglas. Laura Bush would finally write about the accident after her husband left office, in her 2010 memoir, Spoken from the Heart, recounting that she and her friend were hurrying to a drive-in movie. Douglas, whose neck was broken, died at the local hospital.
- Coup leader General Duong Van Minh formally took office as the new head of state of South Vietnam, with civilian Nguyen Ngoc Tho as the prime minister.
- Died: Daniel Mannix, 99, Irish-born Australian clergyman who served as the Roman Catholic Archbishop of Melbourne since 1917

== November 7, 1963 (Thursday) ==
- In the Wunder von Lengede ("Miracle of Lengede"), 11 underground miners were rescued two weeks after they had been feared drowned in a deep iron mine near Lengede in West Germany. They had been among 129 men who were working underground when a sludge pond had given way, flooding the mines. Stuck nearly 200 feet (61 m) below the surface of the buttock, 21 people in their group had been able to find air in an unsupported section of the mine, but rockfalls had killed 10 of the survivors over the days that followed. By November 2, the forty people still entombed had all been given up for dead, but sound equipment picked up tapping, and drilling commenced. After five days, the drilled hole was large enough to lower a bomb-shaped cylinder (known as the Dahlbuschbombe) into the cavity. The first person to climb inside and to be brought to the surface was 51-year-old Heinz Kull, and over the next hour, the other ten came out. Last of the group was Bernhard Wolter, credited by his comrades with having kept up their hopes during the ordeal.
- Nelson Rockefeller, the Governor of New York, entered the 1964 U.S. presidential campaign by announcing on NBC's Today news show that he would be a candidate for the Republican Party nomination. Following that appearance from a studio in Albany, he flew to Nashua, New Hampshire to address a crowd of supporters. U.S. Senator Barry Goldwater of Arizona, the front-runner for the Republican nomination in polls of voters, made no comment but was expected to enter the race. President John F. Kennedy was not expected to have any opposition in his nomination as the Democratic Party candidate for 1964.
- Major General Leighton I. Davis outlined U.S. Department of Defense (DOD) plans for support in carrying out Project Gemini operations. As DOD representative, Major General Davis acted as DOD's single point of contact with NASA, responsible for meeting NASA's needs for DOD support in the launch, tracking network, planned contingency recovery and medical assistance, as well as communications and public affairs.

== November 8, 1963 (Friday) ==
- Five jewel thieves in Manhattan overpowered six unarmed employees and the driver of a station wagon transporting precious gems and gold valued at $3 million (equivalent to $31.5 million in 2025), after forcing the vehicle to the curb at 12th Avenue and 41st Street, in a carefully planned operation that would have been the perfect crime, except for one flaw in the scheme. Four of the bandits got back in their own truck, and the remaining one prepared to drive the car and its cargo to a place where the vehicle could be looted. The getaway driver, however, did not know how to operate the clutch and gear shift in a car with standard transmission, and abandoned the stalled vehicle — and its multimillion-dollar contents — a block away.
- Sir Alec Douglas-Home, the new Prime Minister of the United Kingdom, won the by-election for Kinross and Western Perthshire, to fill the House of Commons vacancy left by the August 15 death of Gilmour Leburn. Placed as a candidate in one of the most conservative constituencies in the nation, Home drew more than 57% of the vote, with more than twice as much as Liberal Party candidate Alistair Duncan Millar or Labour candidate Andrew Forrester. Having renounced his title and his place in the House of Lords, the former Earl of Home rejoined the House of Commons where he served from 1931 to 1945 and from 1950 to 1951.
- The Federal Bureau of Investigation installed a wiretap on the home telephone line of civil rights activist Martin Luther King Jr., after approval by U.S. Attorney General Robert F. Kennedy on recommendations by FBI Director J. Edgar Hoover. During the rest of Dr. King's stay in the home, the FBI monitored his phone conversations, discontinuing the surveillance on April 30, 1965.
- The crash of Finnair Flight 217 killed 22 people, with only three survivors. A defect in the DC-3's altimeter had led the pilot to believe that he was at a higher altitude as he made an instrument landing and the DC-3 airliner struck the ground prematurely as it was coming in for a landing at Mariehamn Airport.
- Born: Eric B. (stage name for Louis Eric Barrier), American rapper and DJ; in Queens, New York

== November 9, 1963 (Saturday) ==
- At 3:20 p.m. local time in the Japanese city of Omuta, a powerful explosion killed 458 coal miners after a cloud of coal dust was ignited by a spark. The blast ripped through the large Mitsui Mikawa coal mine, where more than 1,300 people were underground, twice as many as would have been present normally, because of the afternoon shift change. Those who had not died in the blast were poisoned by carbon monoxide, and hundreds of survivors were hospitalized. Even two years after the disaster, the Asahi Evening News would report in late 1965, 286 people were still in the hospital, and 20 of them remained comatose. Under the Japanese workers' compensation law at the time, however, "compensatory aid lessens if the victim is not cured within three years."
- Less than seven hours later and 600 miles (970 km) eastward in Japan, a triple railroad disaster at Tsurumi killed 161 people after starting shortly before 10:00 p.m. near Yokohama. The driver of a large dump truck had tried to cross a set of six tracks near the Tsurumi Station, in front of a slow moving freight train, which was derailed in the collision. Three of the freight cars were scattered over the eastbound tracks used by the high-speed Yokosuka Line. In the next 30 seconds, a passenger train bound for Tokyo crashed into the freight cars, and was scattered over the Yokosuka Line's westbound tracks, where a third train collided with the first two on its way from the Tokyo-suburb of Kawasaki.

== November 10, 1963 (Sunday) ==
- Black Muslim activist Malcolm X delivered what would become a widely re-quoted speech, "Message to the Grass Roots" to the Northern Negro Leadership Conference at the King Solomon Baptist Church in Detroit. Almost all of his listeners were black Christians, and Malcolm X's message was one of revolution rather than accommodation. "You don’t catch hell ’cause you’re a Methodist or Baptist... a Democrat or a Republican... a Mason or an Elk. And you sure don’t catch hell ’cause you’re an American; ’cause if you was an American, you wouldn’t catch no hell. You catch hell ’cause you’re a black man. You catch hell, all of us catch hell, for the same reason." He was unsparing in his criticism of "The Big Six" (Martin Luther King Jr., Roy Wilkins, Whitney Young, Adam Clayton Powell Jr., A. Philip Randolph and James Farmer), Negro leaders who he said had sold out to the white man, and added that the March on Washington was "nothing but a circus, with clowns and all... white and black clowns."
- GANEFO, the first GAmes of the New Emerging FOrces, commenced in opening ceremonies at Jakarta, Indonesia, after Indonesia had been ruled ineligible to participate in the 1964 Olympic Games. Despite warnings to member nations from the International Olympic Committee, FIFA, and other organizations against participation in the GANEFO events, 2,404 athletes from 63 nations participated and the games were played until the closing ceremonies on November 22. The team from the People's Republic of China (which had not participated in the Olympics since 1952) won 68 gold medals (and 171 overall). In second place was the Soviet Union, which heeded the IOC warning and did not send its top Olympic athletes to Jakarta.
- An American version of the British television news satire That Was The Week That Was was shown at 9:00 p.m. Eastern time as a special broadcast on NBC, and would become a regular series two months later. For the pilot, the host was Henry Fonda. Supporting players would include Woody Allen, Steve Allen, Bill Cosby, and future M*A*S*H star Alan Alda.
- Born:
  - Mike Powell, American track and field athlete whose 1991 leap of 29 feet 4.25 inches (8.9472 m) remains the world's record for the long jump; in Philadelphia. As of 2023, he has held the record (set on August 30, 1991) for the furthest leap forward by a human being for more than 31 years.
  - Mike McCarthy, American football coach, head coach of the NFL's Dallas Cowboys since 2020, and head coach of the Green Bay Packers 2006 to 2018; in Pittsburgh

== November 11, 1963 (Monday) ==
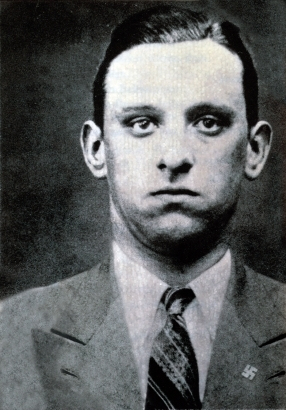
The SS officer who arrested Anne Frank

- In Vienna, Volksstimme, the official newspaper of the Communist Party of Austria (KPO), broke the news story of the discovery of Karl Silberbauer, the man who had arrested Anne Frank. Silberbauer, whom Nazi-hunter Simon Wiesenthal had identified to the Vienna police as one of their inspectors, had been suspended from the force on October 4 after admitting that he had been the SS officer who arrested the Frank family on August 4, 1944, in Amsterdam.
- Seventy-year-old adventurer William Willis stepped ashore at Falulela on the island of Upolu in Samoa, along with his two cats, Kiki and Aussie, after a voyage of 130 days and 7,540 miles (12,130 km) on his trimaran boat, Age Unlimited. On July 5, he had set off from Callao in Peru and set off for Australia, hoping to reach Sydney, and had been considered missing since that time. On his third try, in 1964, Willis would succeed in his Peru to Australia trip. Finally, in 1968, Willis would set off from Montauk, Long Island, in hopes of reaching Plymouth, England, but disappear after being forced to abandon his boat.
- In Kano, in the autonomous Northern Region of Nigeria, Muslim scholar and politician Mudi Salga founded Fityan al-Islam (Heroes of Islam), a fundamentalist group, to challenge the modernization efforts of the Region's leader, Ahmadu Bello. The group would become "the most dynamic Islamic organization in Northern Nigeria", and open thousands of schools and mosques throughout the Nigerian nation.
- The first interplanetary probe in the Soviet Union's Zond program, designated Kosmos 21, failed to escape Earth orbit after a misfiring of a rocket and a failure of proper attitude control.
- Tokyo Electron, an electronic equipment manufacturing brand in Japan, was founded.
- Died: André Le Troquer, 79, French lawyer and politician

== November 12, 1963 (Tuesday) ==
- Ten days before his death, U.S. President Kennedy signed off on National Security Memorandum Number 271, a then-secret memorandum to NASA Administrator James E. Webb, titled "Cooperation with the USSR on Outer Space Matters", telling Webb "to assume personally the initiative and central responsibility" to develop specific technical proposals "for broader cooperation between the United States and the USSR in outer space, including cooperation in lunar landing programs." Following Kennedy's death, the United States continued pursuing its goal of putting a man on the Moon before the end of the decade— and without Soviet assistance.
- In a major political shakeup in Iraq, Ali Salih al-Sa'di, the Vice Premier, was fired from the leadership of Iraq's Ba'athist Party, and he and 18 of his colleagues were seized at gunpoint and flown into exile in Madrid. Replacing the Ba'ath leadership was Prime Minister Ahmed Hassan al-Bakr at the head of a 15-member council. The shakeup would lead to repercussions that would change the Iraqi government. Reportedly, 15 members of the Iraqi Army burst into a meeting of the Ba'ath Congress and seized al-Sadi and the other advisers at gunpoint before putting them on the airplane to Spain.
- Salah al-Din al-Bitar stepped down as Prime Minister of Syria and was replaced by Major General Amin al-Hafiz, the commander in chief of Syria's armed forces and chairman of the National Revolutionary Council. Bitar had talked for several months about his wish to resign from the Ba'ath government, and his departure was not related to the shakeup within the Ba'ath Party in neighboring Iraq.

== November 13, 1963 (Wednesday) ==
- King Hassan II of Morocco, who had been ruling as both head of state and head of the government since ascending the throne in 1961, appointed Justice Minister Ahmed Bahnini as the first civilian Prime Minister of Morocco since King Mohammed V had removed Abdallah Ibrahim on May 20, 1960. Foreign Minister Ahmed Balafrej, who had briefly served as Premier in 1958 and who wanted to keep Morocco neutral, was replaced by Agriculture Minister Ahmed Reda Guedria, who wanted more co-operation with the Western nations. The shakeup in the north African nation came following the border conflict with neighboring Algeria.
- Two hours after Radio Baghdad announced that Iraq's Ba'athist Party was now led by Prime Minister Ahmed Hassan al-Bakr, the station was taken off the air by supporters of recently deposed leader Ali Salih al-Sadi. Iraqi fighter jets strafed the Presidential Palace, and thousands of demonstrators protested the shakeup. Premier al-Bakr and eight of the new 15-member Ba'athist council were overthrown and sent into exile in Beirut, Lebanon, the next day.
- President Sukarno of Indonesia dissolved his cabinet, six days after the death of First Minister Djuanda Kartawidjaja. The acting First Minister, Dr. Johannes Leimena, was dismissed, and Sukarno abolished the position entirely, then revived the office of Prime Minister of Indonesia and appointed himself as head of government in addition to head of state.
- The popular children's book Where the Wild Things Are, by Maurice Sendak, was published for the first time, issued by Harper & Row.
- The Gemini Management Panel began reexamination of the Gemini launch schedules, for those which needed it. The new schedule announced, and the actual launch dates, would be March 17, 1964 for Gemini 1 (which would happen on April 8); August 11, 1964 for Gemini 2 (launched January 19, 1965); and November 6, 1964, for Gemini 3 (launched March 23, 1965).
- Born: Joe Dooley, Irish hurler; in Clareen, County Offaly

== November 14, 1963 (Thursday) ==
- Heavy rains struck northern Haiti and eastern Cuba. In Haiti, flash flooding and landslides at Grande-Rivière-du-Nord killed at least 500 people on the first and second days of the storm. The nation's public health department made its estimate based on the number of bodies that had been recovered a week later.
- Manned Spacecraft Center (MSC) began a drop-test program over Galveston Bay using a helicopter-towed half-scale paraglider. The first test successfully tested the U-shaped deployment configuration, but on the November 26 third test, the paraglider was damaged beyond repair on impact. After a fourth test of another wing on December 19, no further paraglider tests would be done.

== November 15, 1963 (Friday) ==
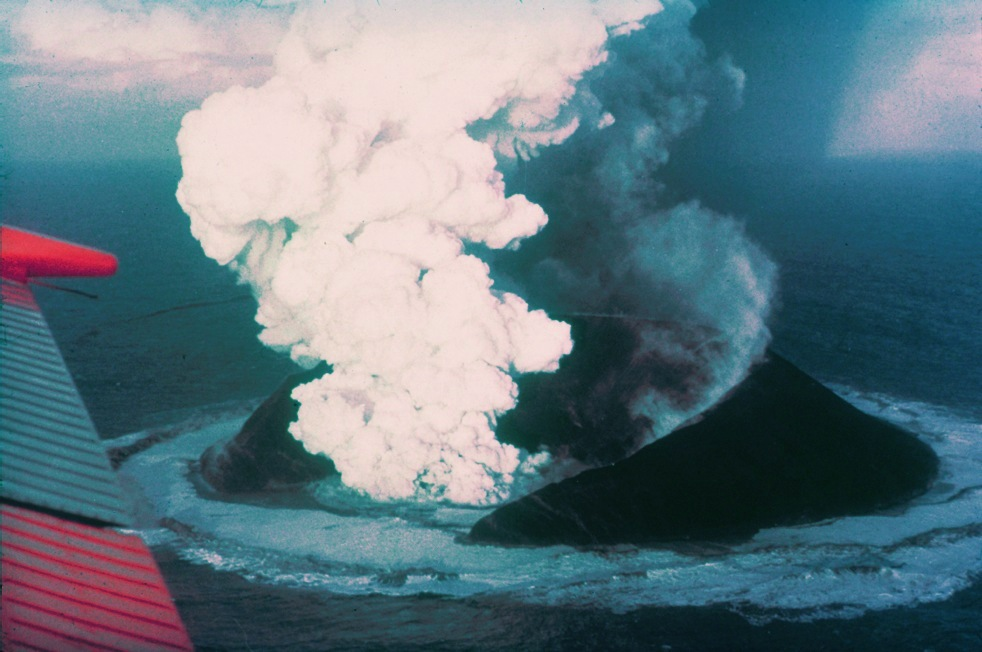
November 15, 1963: The world receives a new island

- The eruption of an undersea volcano created the new island of Surtsey off the coast of Iceland. The crew of the Isleifur II, a fishing boat from Iceland, were the first to discover it. By June 5, 1967, upon the halt of the eruption, the island would have an area of 2.8 square kilometers (1.08 square miles).
- The U.S. Air Force announced that Major Robert W. Smith had set a new record for altitude reached by an airplane from ground takeoff, topping out at 118,860 feet (36,230 m), or more than 22.5 miles (36.2 km) above sea level. Although the feat is commonly described as having happened on this date, Brigadier General Irving L. Branch noted only that it had happened "this week" rather than on that day. Major Smith, a former fighter pilot during the Korean War, was flying an F-104A Starfighter jet that had been outfitted with an additional rocket motor with 6,000 pounds-force (27,000 N) of thrust. He had taken off from the Lockheed Corporation proving grounds in Palmdale, California, about 2,600 feet (790 m) above sea level, and broken a Soviet record of 113,890 feet (34,710 m) set on April 28, 1961.
- Seven days before President Kennedy's scheduled visit to Dallas, Democratic Party leader Baxton Bryant sent an angry telegram to President Kennedy complaining that Democratic supporters were being shut out of the planned November 22 luncheon by Dallas Republicans who were in control of the Dallas Citizens Council. The plea was for the President to do something or face a boycott by his most loyal supporters. "A motorcade from Dallas Love Field to downtown Dallas was arranged for the Kennedys after another Bryant complaint," a United Press International report would note on the eve of the President's visit.
- The first Gemini inertial guidance system was delivered to McDonnell for testing.
- Died: Duncan Kenneth MacTavish, 64, Canadian Senator from Ottawa, and former president of the National Liberal Federation, was killed in a five-car pileup on the Queen Elizabeth Way.

== November 16, 1963 (Saturday) ==
- The Soviet Union released Yale University Professor Frederick C. Barghoorn after 16 days of imprisonment. Dr. Barghoorn, a 52-year-old professor of political science, had been arrested while walking on a street near the Hotel Metropole in Moscow, the day before he was scheduled to fly home from a vacation. He was accused of espionage and kept in a cell in the Lubyanka Prison. Ten days passed before his American colleagues became aware that he had been arrested. After protests by the U.S. Department of State, and the personal assurance by President Kennedy to Premier Khrushchev that Barghoorn was not a spy, the professor was ordered released. Less than two hours later, he was put on British European Airways Flight 911 from Moscow to London.
- Arturo Illia, the President of Argentina, announced a decree cancelling all contracts between Argentina and private corporations for oil production. The largest companies affected were Standard Oil of New Jersey (later Exxon), which operated in the north at the Salta Province, and a combine of British companies that drilled in the south near Comodoro Rivadavia.
- The municipality of Knox, Victoria, was established in Australia by proclamation of the Governor of the state of Victoria, with a population of about 21,000 residents. On July 4, 1969, Knox would qualify to be upgraded from a shire to a city. Fifty-five years later, Knox, a suburb of Melbourne, had more than 150,000 residents.
- Died: Carlo Buti, 61, Italian popular singer

== November 17, 1963 (Sunday) ==
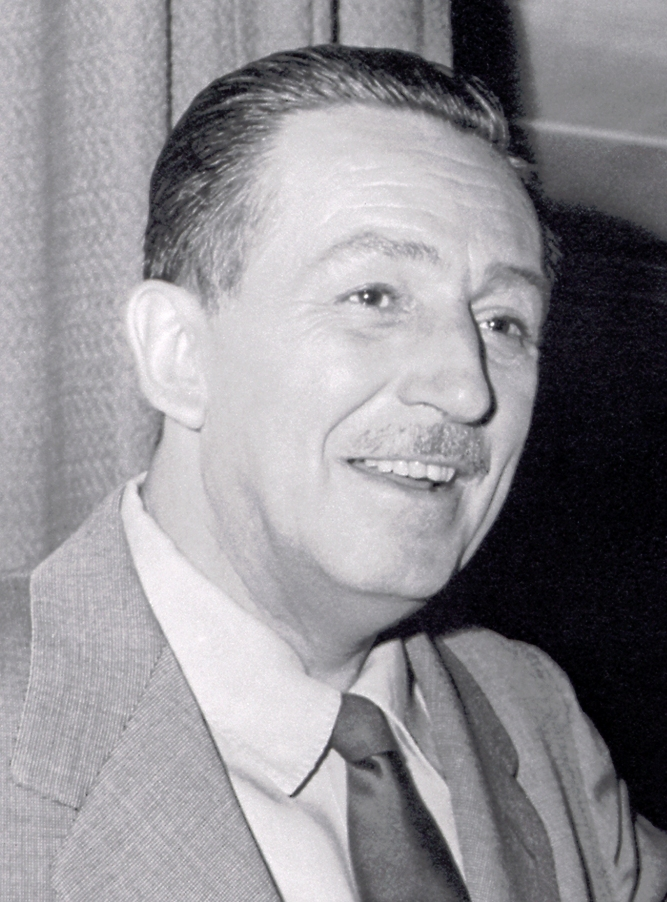
Disney

- At a dinner party, August Busch Jr., Chairman of the Anheuser-Busch Brewing Company, made an unfortunate remark that ended plans for Walt Disney to locate his new theme park in St. Louis, Missouri. Mayor Raymond Tucker had suggested that the proposed park should offer beer and liquor to its patrons, but the Disney Company had reiterated its position that alcohol sales would be inconsistent with the company's image. Busch remarked to Disney, "Any man who thinks he can design an attraction that is going to be a success in this city, and not serve beer or liquor, ought to have his head examined." A historian would write later, "[T]he remark had not offended Walt's sense of morality; it was actually worse than that. It had insulted his business acumen." Disney said nothing to Busch, but upon returning to his hotel, he canceled the next day's plans to sign a letter of commitment to building Riverfront Square in St. Louis, and told one of his vice-presidents, "It's all finished. We're not coming. Forget about it." Five days later, he would find a site in central Florida for his next theme park.
- In Mexico City, the Institutional Revolutionary Party (Partido Revolucionario Institucional or PRI) nominated Gustavo Díaz Ordaz, who had recently resigned as Interior Minister, as its candidate for the 1964 Mexican presidential election. In that the PRI candidate had won seven consecutive presidential elections since 1929, it was expected that Díaz would be the next President of Mexico; he would receive 89% of the popular vote on July 5.
- Douglas Aircraft Corporation began tests of the structural integrity of the Gemini target docking adapter (TDA) for the danger of shroud separation during the launch and ascent of the Agena target vehicle. Testing successfully demonstrated the compatibility of the TDA with the shroud system.

== November 18, 1963 (Monday) ==
- The first electronic push-button telephone with touch-tone dialing was commercially offered by Bell Telephone to all customers in the Pittsburgh area towns of Carnegie and Greensburg, Pennsylvania, after having been tested as early as November 1, 1960, in Findlay, Ohio.
- In the U.S., NBC's evening TV news program The Huntley–Brinkley Report featured a four-minute news feature on The Beatles, marking the group's first appearance on American TV.
- A fire killed 26 of 34 registered guests of the Surfside Hotel in Atlantic City, New Jersey. A tourist hotel in the summer, the hotel regularly served as a convalescent home for elderly people in the offseason after the summer tourist season ended. Ten bodies were never recovered; only two of the other 15 could be identified. A former mental patient and convicted arsonist would be arrested on June 20, 1964, and confess that he had poured gasoline into the hotel's boiler and set it ablaze. However, an Atlantic City grand jury did not find probable cause to return an indictment.
- Iraqi president Abdul Salam Arif, his brother, Brigade General Abdul Rahman Arif and their Iraqi Army supporters suppressed the Ba'ath National Guard Militia, bombed its headquarters, and removed Prime Minister al-Bakr from office and deposed him as Ba'ath Party leader. A new Party Council was created, which did not include al-Bakr or former Vice-Premier al-Sadi.
- Prince Norodom Sihanouk, the ruling monarch of Cambodia, announced that his Southeast Asian nation would sever all military and economic relations with the United States. Sihanouk told a crowd that Cambodian rebels were using American equipment and making incursions into Cambodia from neighboring South Vietnam.
- The Dartford Tunnel under the River Thames opened in the United Kingdom, 164 years after the idea had first been proposed in 1799.

== November 19, 1963 (Tuesday) ==
- In the concluding event for the three-day centennial celebration of the Gettysburg Address delivered by President Abraham Lincoln on November 19, 1863, former U.S. President Dwight D. Eisenhower addressed the crowd in a ceremony of rededication for the Gettysburg National Cemetery. General Eisenhower, who had retired to a farm near the battlefield after his term as president had ended, told the audience, "My friends, Lincoln reminded his hearers that they had no power to dedicate this ground. So we, today, have no power to rededicate it. But with the playing of Taps, the soldier's farewell, we can share the grief of every family who has heard that a son or father or sweetheart has fallen. If we can but do this, we will begin to do our part to solve the unfinished business of which Lincoln spoke."
- Born: Terry Farrell, American television actress best known for Star Trek: Deep Space Nine and Becker; in Cedar Rapids, Iowa
- Died:
  - Donald Summerville, 48, 53rd Mayor of Toronto, died of a heart attack shortly after making a guest appearance at a hockey game for charity. Summerville, who tended goal for a few minutes to entertain the crowd, suffered a heart attack afterward in the arena's locker room. City Council member Philip Givens would be appointed to serve out Summerville's term.
  - Carmen Amaya, 60, Spanish flamenco dancer and singer

== November 20, 1963 (Wednesday) ==
- The deathbed wish of Aldous Huxley, author of Brave New World, was honored by his wife Laura, who injected him with 200 micrograms of the hallucinogen LSD. The drug was delivered to her by recently fired Harvard University Professor Timothy Leary. Huxley would die two days later.
- The Declaration on the Elimination of All Forms of Racial Discrimination was adopted by voice vote, without any dissent, by the United Nations General Assembly.

== November 21, 1963 (Thursday) ==
- At 10:50 a.m., President Kennedy and his wife Jacqueline Kennedy departed the White House on the Marine One helicopter, then flew to San Antonio, Texas on Air Force One to begin a three-day speaking and fundraising tour. Mr. and Mrs. Kennedy then traveled by motorcade through San Antonio, where he dedicated the USAF School of Aerospace Medicine at Brooks Air Force Base. From there, he flew to Houston, where he traveled in another motorcade en route to another speech at the Houston Coliseum and then went to Fort Worth where they spent the night at the Hotel Texas on the eighth floor in Room 850. Speeches were set for the next day at Fort Worth, Dallas and Austin.
- India began its space program with the launching of a sounding rocket from the Thumba Equatorial Rocket Launching Station (TERLS), located at the far south end of the Indian subcontinent, near Thiruvananthapuram in the Kerala State. The rocket test took place 25 minutes after sunset, and reached an altitude of 200 kilometers (124 miles) where it released a sodium vapor cloud in the thermosphere.
- In Japan's general election, the Liberal Democratic Party, led by Prime Minister Hayato Ikeda, retained its comfortable majority in the 467-seat House of Representatives (the Shugiin), despite dropping from 296 seats to 283.
- Died: Robert Stroud, 73, American prisoner known as "The Birdman of Alcatraz", died while incarcerated at Springfield, Missouri.

== November 22, 1963 (Friday) ==
- John F. Kennedy, the 35th president of the United States, was assassinated.
  - Kennedy was riding as a passenger in a Lincoln Continental motorcade in Dealey Plaza of Downtown Dallas, Texas. He was accompanied by his wife, Jacqueline Kennedy, Texas governor John Connally and Texas first lady Nellie Connally, Secret Service Agent Roy Kellerman, and the driver, agent William Greer. The group was part of several cars in a motorcade of vehicles on the way from the Dallas airport, Love Field, to the Dallas Trade Mart, where the President was scheduled to deliver a speech at a luncheon for 2,600 guests. At 12:30 p.m., as their car was passing in front of the Texas School Book Depository at 411 Elm Street, President Kennedy and Governor Connally were struck by bullets fired at long range. The President arrived at the Parkland Memorial Hospital at 12:38 p.m. and was taken into surgery, and pronounced dead at 1:00 p.m.
  - Lee Harvey Oswald, a 24-year-old employee at the book depository, left the building approximately three minutes after the shots were fired, and went to his home at 1026 North Beckley Avenue. At 1:15 p.m., Dallas Police officer J. D. Tippit was shot four times, allegedly by Oswald. Oswald was seen walking into a cinema, the Texas Theatre, when policemen rushed in and patrolman M. N. "Nick" McDonald disarmed and arrested him at 1:50 p.m.
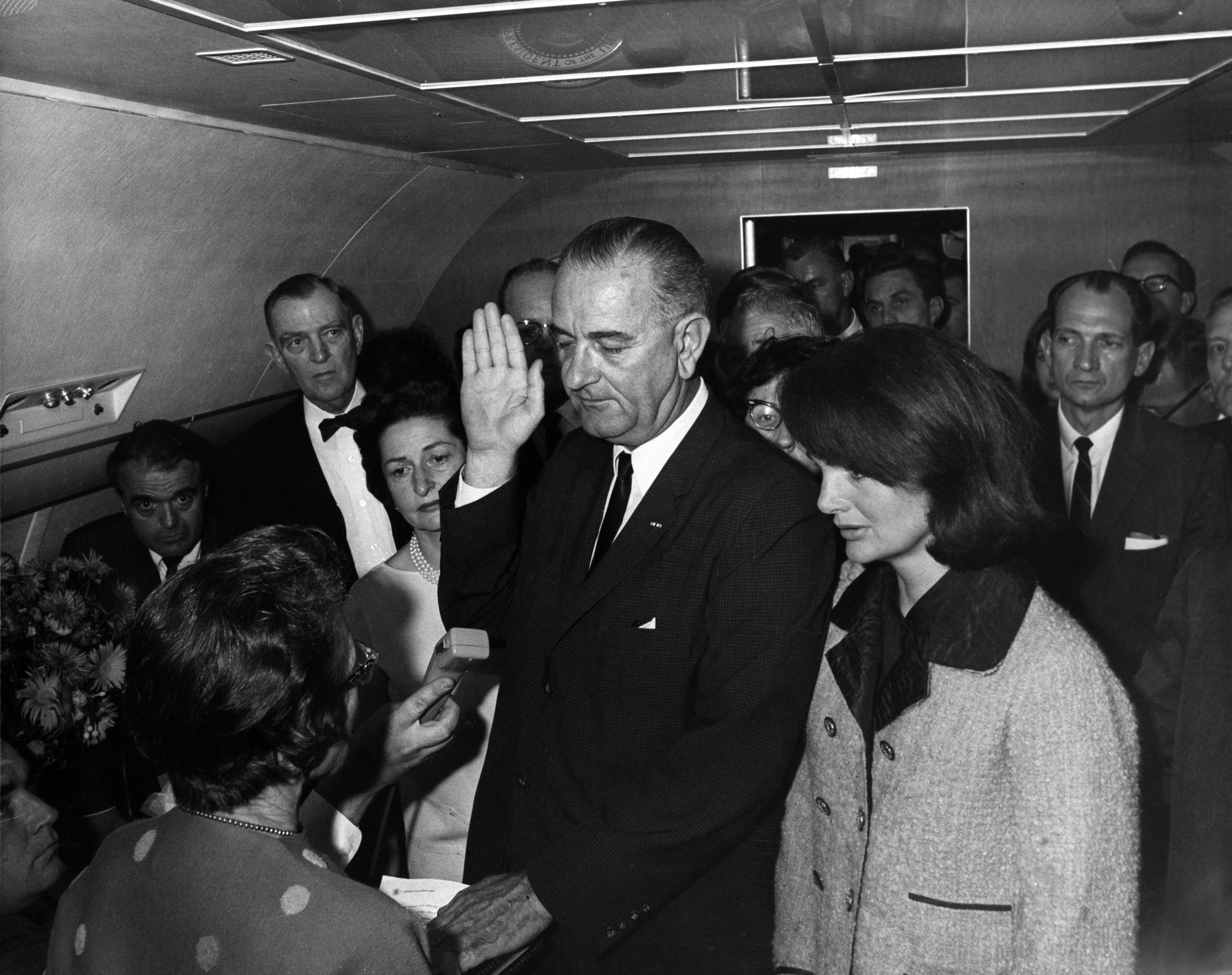
    Johnson sworn in as the 36th U.S. President
  - At 2:38 p.m., Vice President Lyndon B. Johnson was sworn in as the 36th President of the United States by U.S. District Judge Sarah T. Hughes, on board Air Force One prior to the airplane's departure from Dallas. Because a Bible could not be located on the plane, Johnson took his oath instead upon a Roman Catholic liturgical book, the Saint Joseph Sunday Missal. Air Force One, with a coffin containing President Kennedy's body, arrived at Andrews Air Force Base near Camp Springs, Prince George's County, Maryland, at 5:58 p.m. local time.
  - Earlier in the day, at 10:15, President Kennedy had placed a telephone call to former vice president John Nance Garner on the occasion of Garner's 95th birthday. President Kennedy delivered a speech to supporters at the Hotel Texas in Fort Worth before flying on Air Force One to nearby Dallas.
  - In early afternoon editions, some newspapers in the United States ran stories based on the advance text of the speech that President Kennedy had planned to give at the Dallas Trade Mart, anticipating that the address would already have been delivered by the time that the newspapers were being read.
  - On the same day, television signals were broadcast from the United States to Japan for the first time, with transmission sent from Barstow, California, via the Relay 1 satellite, across the Pacific Ocean. A pre-recorded message from President Kennedy was hastily removed from the items to be sent, because the President had died an hour before the scheduled broadcast. Because of the 17-hour time difference between California and Japan, it was 4:00 a.m. on Saturday in Tokyo at the same time that transmission began to the NHK.
- Walt Disney decided on the location for his second amusement park, an eastern counterpart to his successful Disneyland park in California. He and several top executives boarded an airplane in Tampa, in order to fly over the area around Orlando, Florida. Earlier in the month, Disney had scouted sites around St. Louis, Missouri; Niagara Falls, New York; and New Orleans, Louisiana. The other potential Florida site was in Ocala, but Disney made his decision after seeing that the ongoing construction of Interstate 4 would meet with the Florida Turnpike, and that the potential site would be adjacent to swampland that would be unsuitable for competing businesses.
- The GANEFO closed in Indonesia. Earlier in the day, the games' association football tournament final was played between the United Arab Republic and North Korea before 100,000 fans in Jakarta. The score was tied 0–0 at the end of regulation time, and a 30-minute overtime period was added. After the extra time, the score was tied at 1–1, so the gold medal was decided by a coin toss, which the UAR won.
- Testing by humans of Gemini's ballute (balloon and parachute) escape system began with a live jump over El Centro, California. In all, 18 live jumps by volunteers and six dummy drops would take place between November 22 and January 9, 1964. Initially, a 36-inch (910 mm) diameter ballute would be used before more tests showed that a 48-inch (1,200 mm) diameter would be more effective.
- William Clay Ford Sr., one of the grandsons of auto magnate Henry Ford, purchased the NFL's Detroit Lions for $6 million, paid to the other shareholders of the Detroit Football Company that had owned the franchise since 1938.
- The Beatles' second album, With the Beatles, was released in the United Kingdom by Parlophone Records, and became an immediate hit. The album included their hit song "All My Loving".
- Born:
  - Brian Robbins, American TV actor ("Eric Maridian" on Head of the Class), TV producer (Smallville), and film director (Varsity Blues, Norbit); in Brooklyn
  - Andrew Clyde, Canadian-born U.S. Representative for Georgia's 9th Congressional District since 2021; in Walkerton, Ontario
- Died:
  - John F. Kennedy, 46, President of the United States
  - C. S. Lewis, 64, British novelist, poet, academic, medievalist, literary critic, essayist, lay theologian and Christian advocate
  - Aldous Huxley, 69, English novelist
  - J. D. Tippit, 39, American police officer

== November 23, 1963 (Saturday) ==
- At 5:15 p.m. on the BBC television network, the very first episode of the series Doctor Who was broadcast. William Hartnell was the first actor to portray the title character, in a story entitled An Unearthly Child. During the 60 years of the show's run, 15 actors would portray the Doctor, and the change of appearance would be explained as the ability of Time Lords to accomplish "regeneration".

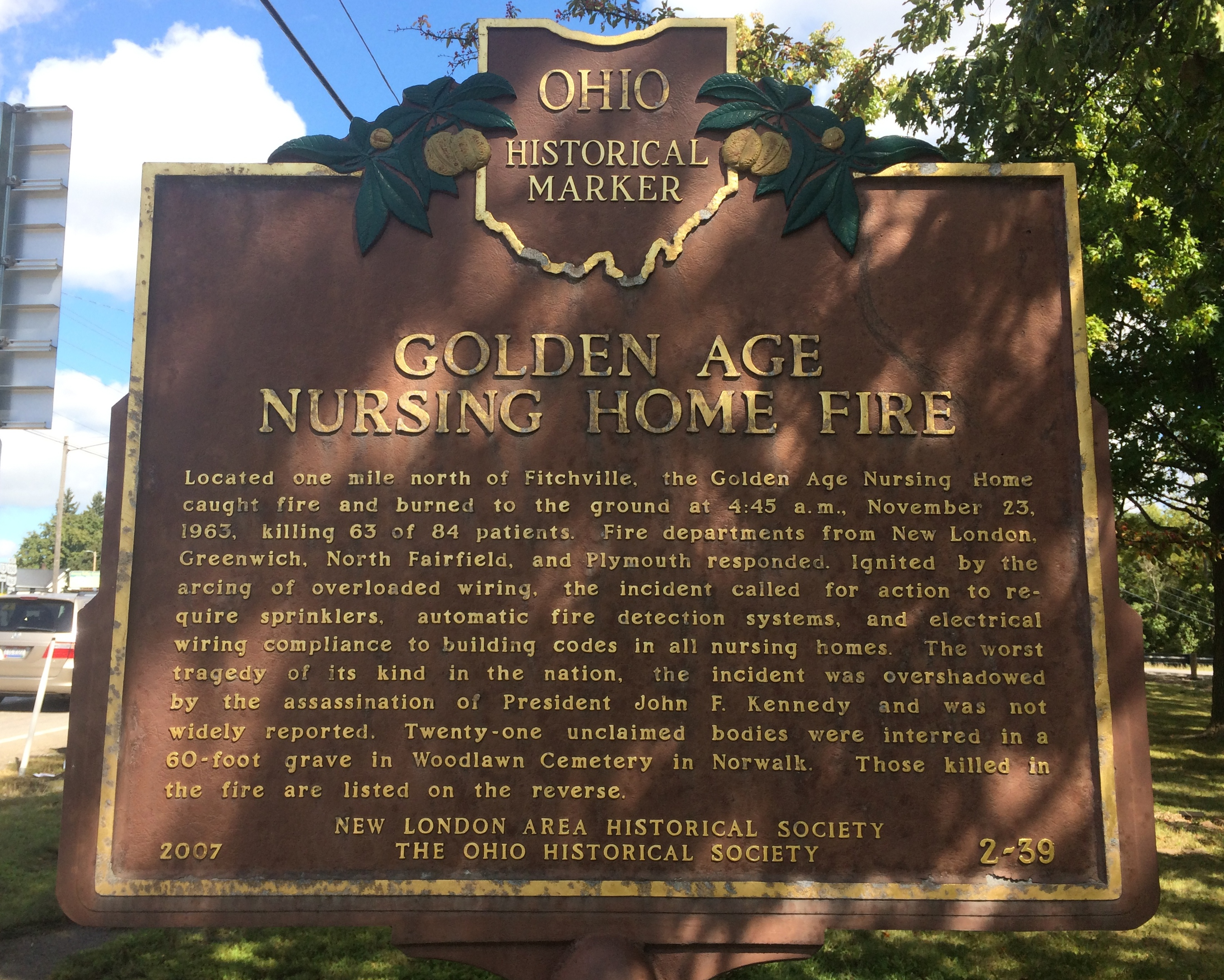
Historical Marker of the fire in Fitchville

- A fire killed 63 elderly people at the Golden Age Nursing Home, located at Fitchville, Ohio. Investigators concluded that the fire was caused by the overloading of electrical circuits, and that the lack of plans for an evacuation procedure, the lack of a fire hydrant within five miles of the facility, and the lack of knowledge of the correct fire department to call added to the death toll. Tragically, the first call to a phone operator for help went to the fire department of Norwalk, Ohio, but the dispatcher declined to respond because Fitchville was outside of the Norwalk jurisdiction. The New London, Ohio fire department did not reach the scene until half an hour after the electrical fire, traced to the plugging in of a steam table, had started.

== November 24, 1963 (Sunday) ==
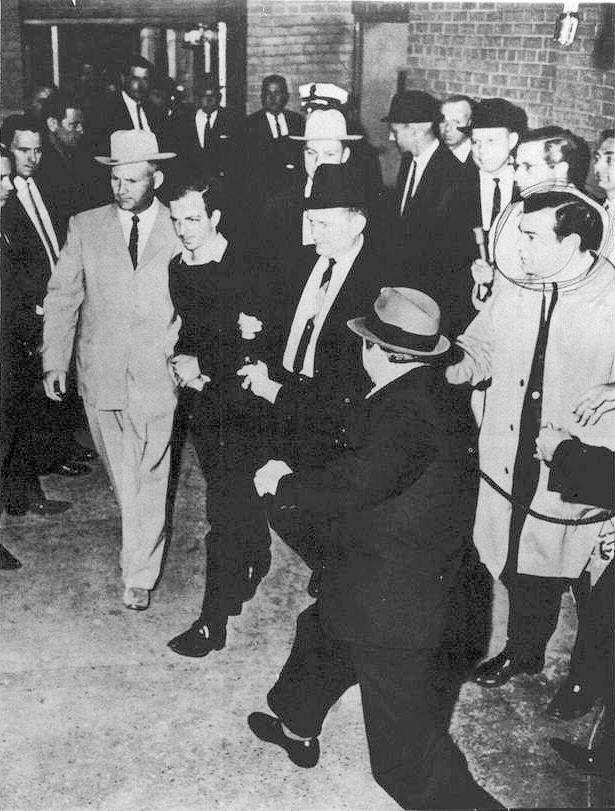
November 24, 1963: Accused assassin Lee Harvey Oswald killed on live television

- Despite being surrounded by a crowd of officers in the Dallas Police Department headquarters, Lee Harvey Oswald, the accused assassin of John F. Kennedy, was shot and mortally wounded by nightclub owner Jack Ruby. Because his imminent transfer from the police department to the Dallas County jail was being covered on live television on NBC, millions of viewers were watching as Ruby shot Oswald in the abdomen, at point blank range, with a .38 caliber revolver. The shooting took place at 11:21 a.m. local time; Oswald was taken into surgery at Parkland Memorial Hospital, and died at 1:07 p.m., never to face trial.
- At one of his first meetings with foreign policy advisors since becoming president, Lyndon Johnson rescinded President Kennedy's plans to withdraw soldiers from South Vietnam. According to McGeorge Bundy, the National Security Advisor, Johnson told the group, "I am not going to lose Vietnam. I am not going to be the President who saw Southeast Asia go the way China went." Johnson then issued a statement reaffirming the nation's commitment to support South Vietnam militarily and economically.
- North American Aviation issued its report of a study of extended space missions for the Apollo program and the effects of prolonged weightlessness, and suggested that astronauts could serve missions of up to one year in an Earth-orbiting laboratory. For shorter missions, the company suggested modifying the existing Mercury and Gemini capsules, rather than creating new vehicles. North American gave detailed descriptions of how existing systems could be modified for the Apollo command and service module to become a habitable orbiting laboratory by modifying self-contained systems and life-support equipment, and that the basic concepts could be developed within a reasonable time and cost.
- The National Football League played all seven of its Week 11 games as scheduled, at Cleveland, Los Angeles, Milwaukee, Minneapolis, New York, Philadelphia and Pittsburgh, while the American Football League postponed all three of its games.
- Died:
  - Lee Harvey Oswald, 24, American veteran who assassinated John F. Kennedy

== November 25, 1963 (Monday) ==
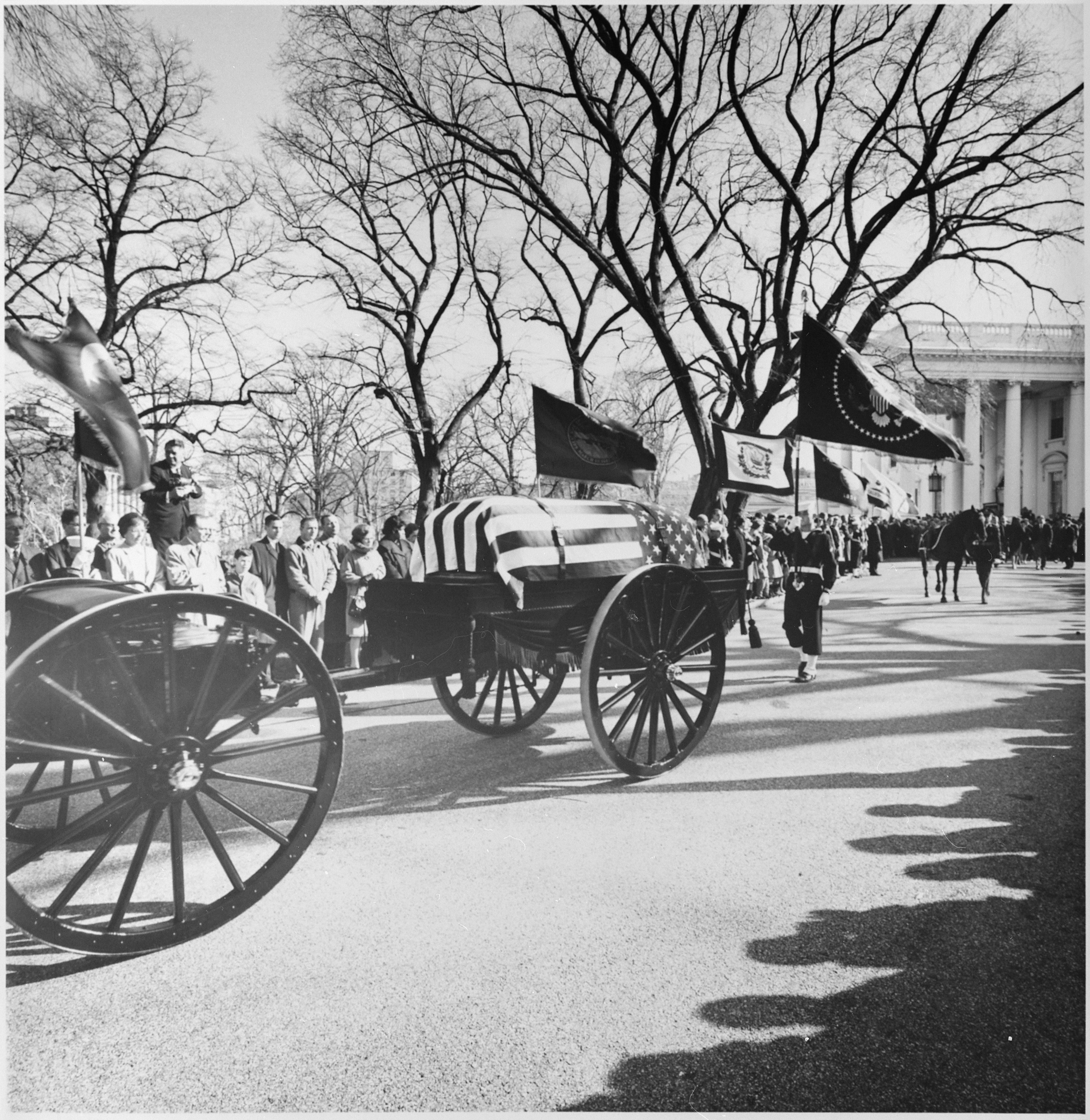
November 25, 1963: State funeral of President Kennedy

- The state funeral of John F. Kennedy took place in Washington, D.C., as the late President's casket was transported in the funeral procession to the Arlington National Cemetery. 600 million viewers watched the funeral on live television, which was beamed by satellite to twenty-three countries. Present at the occasion were 220 foreign dignitaries from 92 countries, including eight heads of state and ten prime ministers. In addition to U.S. President Lyndon Johnson were the presidents of France (Charles de Gaulle); West Germany (Heinrich Lübke); Ireland (Éamon de Valera); South Korea (Park Chung Hee); the Philippines (Diosdado Macapagal) and Israel (Zalman Shazar), and former U.S. Presidents Harry S. Truman and Dwight D. Eisenhower. Prime Ministers arrived from the United Kingdom (Alec Douglas-Home); Canada (Lester B. Pearson); West Germany (Chancellor Ludwig Erhard); Japan (Hayato Ikeda); Sweden (Tage Erlander); Norway (Einar Gerhardsen); Denmark (Jens Otto Krag); Austria (Chancellor Alfons Gorbach); Turkey (İsmet İnönü); Tunisia (Bahi Ladgham); Yugoslavia (Petar Stambolić); and Jamaica (Alexander Bustamante). Royal personages were Emperor Haile Selassie I of Ethiopia and King Baudouin I of Belgium, as well as Prince Philip, the husband of Queen Elizabeth II; Queen Frederica, wife of the King of Greece; and Jean, the heir apparent to the duchy of Luxembourg. The Soviet Union was represented by its First Deputy Prime Minister, Anastas Mikoyan. The Roman Catholic Archbishop of Boston, Richard Cardinal Cushing, delivered the funeral mass at the St. Matthew's Cathedral, in the presence of the late President's widow, daughter and son.
- Three hours after the funeral of President Kennedy was completed, graveside services were held for Lee Harvey Oswald at the Rose Hill Cemetery near Fort Worth, Texas. Local police and the U.S. Secret Service did not allow the general public to be present, and the only other persons present were Oswald's wife, mother, brother, and two daughters. After a Lutheran minister from Dallas reconsidered appearing for the service, the Reverend Louis Saunders appeared on behalf of the Fort Worth Council of Churches, telling newsmen, "We do not want it said a man can be buried in Fort Worth without a minister." Oswald was buried in a family plot that had been owned for several years by his mother, and six of the reporters present served as pallbearers. The Miller Funeral Home of Fort Worth was hired for the arrangements, and police with guard dogs were stationed at the cemetery indefinitely in order to protect against vandalism.
- Funeral services were held for fallen Dallas policeman J. D. Tippit at the Beckley Hills Baptist Church in Dallas, in a service attended by 1,000 of his fellow officers and mourners from the community. Burial followed at the Laureland Cemetery, in a memorial presided over by Pastor C. D. Tipps, in the presence of Tippit's widow, daughter and two sons.
- The first renaming of places for the late President Kennedy took place in two cities outside the United States. At El Biar, a suburb of Algiers, President of Algeria Ahmed Ben Bella and U.S. Ambassador William J. Porter attended a ceremony where the Place de la Republique was designated as the Place John Kennedy. That evening in West Berlin, the Rudolf-Wilde-Platz in front of the City Hall, where Kennedy had delivered his "Ich bin ein Berliner" speech, was renamed the John-F.-Kennedy-Platz in a memorial ceremony. A few months later, the Algerian sign with Kennedy's name would be removed and not be replaced; a report a year after Kennedy's death said that the square at El Biar was dominated by "a huge billboard with the words 'Self-management is the sure way of socialism!'"
- For only the third time in history, telephone service in the United States was halted for one minute. At noon, Eastern time, AT&T operators bowed their heads in mourning for President Kennedy. The only other occasions were on April 18, 1920, after the death of AT&T President Theodore N. Vail, and on August 4, 1922, following the death of telephone inventor Alexander Graham Bell.
- Abraham Zapruder sold all rights to his 8mm film of the Kennedy assassination to LIFE Magazine for $150,000 to be paid in installments of $25,000 per year. Two days later, Zapruder donated his first $25,000 to the widow of Officer J. D. Tippit.
- Las Vegas closed all of its casinos for only the third time in its history. The first two times had been on Good Friday (March 22) in 1940, and on April 12, 1945, after President Franklin D. Roosevelt died.
- MSC received proposals for the Gemini extravehicular life-support system package during "spacewalks" of up to 15 minutes. The package would include a high-pressure gaseous oxygen supply bottle and regulators and valves for control of oxygen flow in an open loop. The contract was awarded to the Garrett Corporation in January.

== November 26, 1963 (Tuesday) ==
- U.S. President Johnson issued National Security Action Memorandum 273 (NSAM 273), a modification of American policy in Vietnam. Although the memorandum had already been drafted by adviser McGeorge Bundy at the request of President Kennedy, Johnson added some modifications. Most notably, the memo "for the first time introduced the word 'win' into the U.S. objective". The declaration read that "It remains the central object of the United States in South Vietnam to assist the people and Government of that country to win their contest against the externally directed and supported Communist conspiracy," which, one historian observes, "unmistakably obliged the United States to deeper responsibilities that would lead to war."
- During a meeting between President Johnson and Soviet Vice-Premier Anastas Mikoyan at the White House, made while Mikoyan was in town for John F. Kennedy's funeral, the President assured the Soviet envoy that the United States would not invade Cuba during his presidency. Two days later, however, Johnson instructed CIA Director John A. McCone to develop policies that were "more aggressive", including a possible May 30, 1964 invasion.
- The U.S. Federal Reserve Bank began the removal of silver certificates from circulation, starting with the discontinuation of the one dollar notes. After a dramatic increase in the U.S. Department of the Treasury's supply of silver dollars in one month, Secretary Douglas Dillon would announce on March 25, 1964, that the certificates would no longer be exchangeable for anything other than regular bills of the same denomination.
- All regularly scheduled television programming resumed in the United States, after having been preempted since Friday afternoon for news coverage of, and tributes to, the late President Kennedy.National network broadcasting of entertainment programs began at 8:00 a.m. Eastern time with Captain Kangaroo on CBS, local programs on ABC at 10:00, and the game show Say When!! on NBC, also at 10:00.
- Jack Ruby was formally indicted by the grand jury of Dallas County, Texas, for the murder of Lee Harvey Oswald. He would be found guilty of murder on March 14, 1964, and sentenced to be executed in the electric chair, though an appeals court would reverse the conviction in 1966 and remand the case for a second trial. Before he could be retried, Ruby would die from lung cancer on January 3, 1967.
- Big Butte School, in Butte, Montana, became the first of almost 1,000 schools to be renamed in honor of the late President Kennedy. Upon unanimous vote of the board for the school board district at a special meeting, the institution was rechristened as "John F. Kennedy Elementary School".
- Parliamentary elections were held in South Korea. Despite receiving only one-third of the votes overall, the Democratic Republican Party won 110 of the 175 seats in the National Assembly because the opposition for most seats was split among several other political parties.
- Cuba issued Law 1129, directing all Cuban males between the age of 16 and 44 to register for military service, effective December 1. Teenage boys would enter military schools beginning in April 1964.
- The American satellite Explorer 18 was launched as a project to study the magnetic field around the Moon, using a package of instruments referred to as the "IMP" (Interplanetary Monitoring Platform).
- Died: Edwin B. Willis, 70, American set designer for MGM Studios, who won eight Academy Awards during his career

== November 27, 1963 (Wednesday) ==
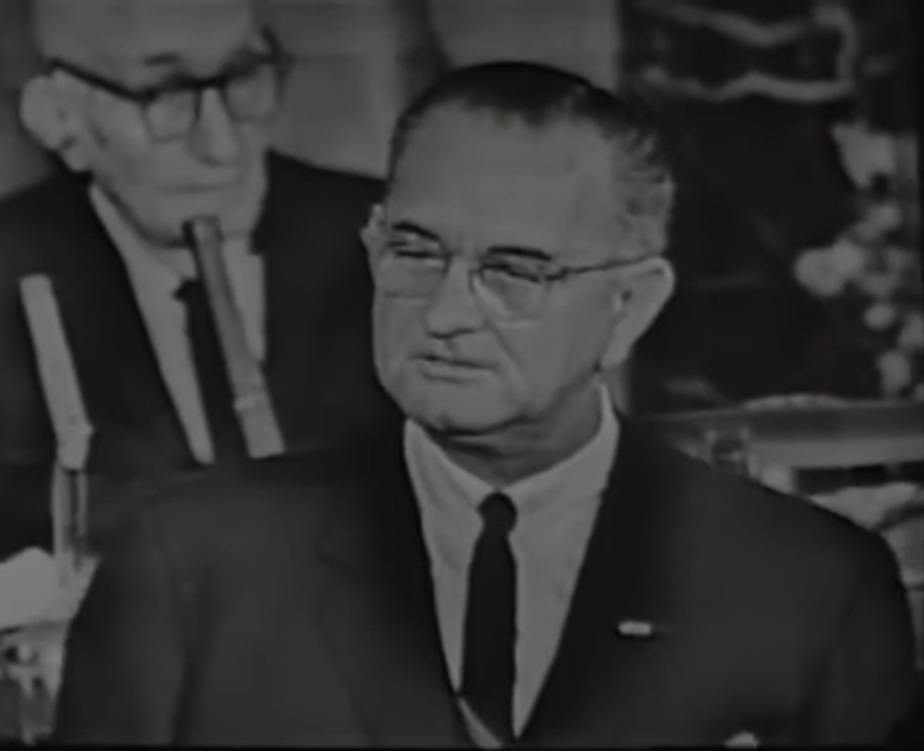
November 27, 1963: President Johnson addresses Congress

- President Lyndon B. Johnson addressed a joint session of Congress in his first major speech since being sworn in as President of the United States, and pledged that he would not depart from the programs that had been started by his predecessor, John F. Kennedy. In what would become known as his "Let Us Continue" speech, he urged Congress to pass legislation for a tax cut and a civil rights bill. "All I have I would have given gladly not to be standing here today," Johnson told Congress, calling Kennedy "the greatest leader of our time... struck down by the foulest deed of our time." Reminding his listeners that Kennedy had said "let us begin" in his inaugural address, Johnson added, "Today in this moment of new resolve, I would say to my fellow Americans, let us continue.... Let us here highly resolve that John Fitzgerald Kennedy did not live— or die— in vain."
- The day after the launch of the IMP into space, the United States made its first successful test of the Atlas-Centaur launch system, as well as a new rocket propellant combining liquid hydrogen and liquid oxygen. The 5-tonne (4.9-long-ton; 5.5-short-ton) payload was, in the words of a NASA spokesman, a "relatively worthless satellite, made up mostly of old rocket casing", but large enough to be visible with the naked eye. The spokesman compared its apparent magnitude to "a second or third magnitude star... a tumbling action will make it sort of flash in the sky." By comparison, all but one of the stars within the "Big Dipper" in Ursa Major are second magnitude.
- The Fuerzas Armadas de Liberación Nacional (FALN), a group of leftist revolutionaries in Venezuela, kidnapped U.S. Army Colonel James K. Chenault, the deputy chief of the Army mission in Caracas, as the mission chauffeur was picking Chenault up at his home. The FALN gunmen would release Colonel Chenault, unharmed, on December 5.
- The 17 members of the Council of Europe signed the Strasbourg Patent Convention, providing for a common patent law to apply in Western European countries. It would not be ratified by enough nations to make it effective, however, until August 1, 1980.

== November 28, 1963 (Thursday) ==
- On Thanksgiving Day, U.S. President Johnson issued an Executive Order the immediate renaming of the space center at Cape Canaveral, in Florida, to "Cape Kennedy", then told the nation about it as part of a televised address. In addition, the President noted that the cape itself "shall be known hereafter as Cape Kennedy". The day before, at Johnson's request, the United States Board on Geographic Names had approved the renaming of the peninsula, which had first been identified as "Cabo Cañaveral" by explorer Juan Ponce de León. Despite protests from the residents of the city of Cape Canaveral, Florida, the order affected only the cape itself and the federally owned property, rather than the town. Florida Governor Farris Bryant told critics on December 5, "The people of Florida, in the year 2063, will look back and understand what President Johnson has done and will approve." However, the old name would be restored less than ten years later, on October 9, 1973, at the request of Florida Congressman Lou Frey
- Born: Armando Iannucci, Scottish satirist; in Glasgow
- Died: Karyn Kupcinet, 22, American actress. She was found dead in her West Hollywood apartment two days later by friends, actor Mark Goddard and his wife. The death is officially recorded as an unsolved homicide.

== November 29, 1963 (Friday) ==
- All 118 people on board Trans-Canada Airlines Flight 831, were killed when the Douglas DC-8, crashed in a field near the village of Sainte-Thérèse, Quebec, shortly after taking-off from Montreal's Dorval International Airport en route to Toronto as the first stop on a flight to Vancouver. Most of the passengers were on their way to Vancouver to watch the Grey Cup game for the championship of the Canadian Football League; 16 other people had been caught in a traffic jam on the way to the airport and were fortunate enough to have missed their flight. Until December 12, 1985, when all 256 persons on board Arrow Air Flight 1285 would be killed in an accident at Newfoundland, the Trans-Canada flight would be the worst air disaster in Canada's history.
- President Johnson established the Warren Commission to investigate the assassination of John F. Kennedy. It would take until September 24, 1964 for the Warren Commission to deliver its report.
- The foundation stone for Mirzapur Cadet College was laid in the city of Gorai in East Pakistan (now Bangladesh), by President Ayub Khan.

== November 30, 1963 (Saturday) ==
- A crisis in the island republic of Cyprus, between the Greek and Turkish Cypriots who lived there, was triggered by a 13-point proposal from the President to reform the dual government that had existed there since the nation had gained independence on August 16, 1960. The President, Archbishop Makarios III, was of Greek descent, while the vice-president, Dr. Fazıl Küçük was of Turkish descent, and each had the right to veto the decisions of the other. In addition, enactment of laws had to be done by separate majorities of the Greek Cypriot and the Turkish Cypriot members of the House of Representatives, and each of the five largest cities had separate Greek and Turkish municipalities. With the encouragement of the British High Commissioner, Makarios proposed to amend the nation's constitution to reduce the power of the Turkish minority; the American ambassador to Cyprus had persuaded Makarios to phrase the 13 amendments as suggestions rather than as a declaration.
- In voting for all 122 seats of the Australian House of Representatives, the coalition of the Liberal Party of Prime Minister Robert Menzies with the Country Party, which had a slim 62–60 majority over the Australian Labor Party, increased its lead to a 72–50 margin as the ALP lost ten seats. The election marked the first time that indigenous Australians (referred to at the time as Aborigines) were allowed to vote in nationwide elections on the same basis as other electors, a franchise that had not been available in the states of Western Australia and Queensland or the Northern Territory. In addition, it was the first election where the results could be tallied simultaneously from all electorates on live, nationwide television.
- What would be called the "No Change Election" was held for all 80 seats of the New Zealand House of Representatives. Robert Chapman would write the next day, "it is positively uncanny how, yesterday, the voters of New Zealand went out and repeated themselves. They simply conducted the 1960 election over again with the same amount of non-voting..." Only one of the 80 seats in the Parliament, the Manukau electorate, was filled by a different political party. With results were almost identical to those of three years earlier, the National Party went from having a 46 to 34 majority, to a 45 to 35 majority over the Labour Party.
- Died: Cyril Newall, 1st Baron Newall, 77, who had served as the Governor-General of New Zealand from 1941 to 1946, died in England on the same day as the New Zealand national election.
